This is a list of characters from Downton Abbey, a British period drama television series created by Julian Fellowes and co-produced by Carnival Films and Masterpiece for ITV and PBS, respectively. Some also appear in one or both of the film sequels: Downton Abbey (2019), and Downton Abbey: A New Era (2022).

Cast

Main cast

Recurring cast

Guest cast

The Crawley family

Robert Crawley, 7th Earl of Grantham  

Robert Crawley, Earl of Grantham (played by Hugh Bonneville) (b. 1865), usually called Lord Grantham, is the 7th and current Earl of Grantham. He is the husband of Cora, son of Violet, and father of Mary, Edith and Sybil. Robert is immensely proud of Downton as the place he grew up and takes his responsibility for the estate very seriously; he sees himself as its caretaker, not its owner. Although in some ways his character embodies the traditional values of the aristocracy, Robert does not shun all progress, and he is very protective of and loyal to his family and servants. Despite these virtues, Robert's adherence to tradition lets him down in other ways. He often resists "modern" suggestions for better management of the estate, especially after his daughter Mary joins his sons-in-law Matthew and Tom in running it. His attitudes occasionally clash with that of the more progressive and pragmatic Cora. By the end of the final series, Robert's worsening health forces him to step down from running the estate, leaving the task to Tom and Mary.

Cora Crawley, Countess of Grantham  

Cora Crawley (née Levinson), Countess of Grantham (played by Elizabeth McGovern) (b. 1868), usually called Lady Grantham, is the wife of Robert and mother of Mary, Edith and Sybil. A wealthy American heiress of Jewish descent, she married Robert in 1890 when the Crawleys were in straitened circumstances; her fortune helped rescue Downton. Although she has adopted the lifestyle of the British aristocracy, her character is portrayed as more forward-thinking and open-minded than that of her family, a trait her husband and daughters attribute to her "American-ness". Her industrious nature, first discovered during the First World War when she opens and maintains Downton as a convalescent home for soldiers, and later put to use on the Downton hospital board, often causes conflict with Robert, especially after she becomes president of the hospital board in the final series. However, Robert relents after seeing how effective Cora is in the role. During the summer of 1914, Cora discovers she has become pregnant for the first time in 18 years, but she suffers a miscarriage caused by her maid O'Brien. Shortly after the war, Cora has Spanish influenza and nearly dies before making a full recovery.

Violet Crawley, Dowager Countess of Grantham  

Violet Crawley (The Dowager Countess of Grantham) (played by Maggie Smith) (1841-1928) is Robert's mother and widow of the previous earl. Violet, portrayed as a matriarchal figure and quick of wit despite her age, symbolises the "old world" and order of the pre–First World War days. During and after the war, Violet remains a strong influence at Downton Abbey but finds her influence under threat as social norms change, particularly from Isobel Crawley, with whom she has a tendency to quarrel, and her daughter-in-law Cora, both of whom are more forward-thinking and strong-minded women. She has a strong bond with her granddaughter Mary, to whom she is the most similar. She dies at the end of the second film.

Lady Mary Talbot 

Lady Mary Josephine Talbot (née Crawley) (played by Michelle Dockery) (b. 1891) is the eldest daughter of Lord and Lady Grantham and arguably the centre of interest of all the family story arcs in the series. Early on, she is portrayed as a petulant and cold young woman; as the series progresses, however, she shows more vulnerability and compassion. One of her most constant traits is her unfailing devotion to Downton as her home and, eventually, the estate which she will preside over.

After the death of the heir to the estate and her unofficial fiancé, Mary's relationship with the new heir, distant cousin Matthew Crawley, begins coldly due to their different upbringing. Over time, however, the pair grow closer, and a romance develops. In 1914, Matthew asks Mary to marry him, but she is hesitant because of circumstances regarding the inheritance of the estate. Heartbroken and angered by her hesitancy, Matthew withdraws his proposal and decides to leave Downton. During the second series, Matthew serves in the First World War and both become engaged to other people, but after a series of obstacles, Matthew proposes to her again, and the two marry. After struggling with infertility, Mary becomes pregnant and gives birth to a son, George, at the end of the third series. However, the same day, Matthew is killed in a car crash while driving home from the hospital. Mary struggles to move past her grief, but after the discovery of a letter from Matthew stating he intended to name Mary his sole heiress, she recovers and begins helping her father and brother-in-law Tom manage the estate.

In the fourth series, Mary is pursued by three suitors: Anthony Foyle (Lord Gillingham), Evelyn Napier, and Charles Blake. However, she eventually decides she does not want to marry any of them, providing a shock, especially for Tony. In the fifth series, Mary meets Henry Talbot, a race car driver. Though Mary struggles to overcome her lingering grief about Matthew's death, she realises she loves Henry, and the two marry at the end of series six. In the first film, she has had a daughter with Henry named Caroline. In the second film, Mary has a flirtatious relationship with a film director named Jack Barber, but she stays faithful to Henry.

Edith Pelham, Marchioness of Hexham 

Edith Pelham, Marchioness of Hexham (née Lady Edith Crawley; b. 1892) (played by Laura Carmichael) is the middle daughter of Lord and Lady Grantham. Edith is often the "forgotten" one as she is not considered as pretty and smooth-talking as her older sister, Mary, or as daring and passionate as her younger sister, Sybil. She experiences multiple disappointments in her romantic relationships: she is jilted at the altar by Sir Anthony Strallan in the third series, and her second fiancé Michael Gregson is killed by Nazis while staying in Germany. Further, Edith discovers she is pregnant with Gregson's illegitimate child. However, Edith also experiences success when she pursues a career in journalism and takes charge of Gregson's magazine publishing company. In series six, despite her sister Mary's efforts to separate them, Edith marries Bertie Pelham, becoming a marchioness, and he and her family come to accept her daughter Marigold.

In the first film, she reveals she is pregnant with Bertie's child. She also tells Bertie she is feeling unfulfilled in the role of marchioness. In the second film, their son, Peter, is an infant, and Edith is once again involved in the day-to-day running of her publishing company and writing articles.

Lady Sybil Branson 

Lady Sybil Cora Branson (née Crawley; 1895–1920) (played by Jessica Brown Findlay) is the youngest daughter of Lord and Lady Grantham. She becomes fiercely political and desires to break free from the social restrictions of the times. During the First World War, Sybil serves as an auxiliary nurse and develops feelings for Tom Branson, the family's chauffeur and a staunch Irish nationalist. By the end of the second series, the couple marry and move to Dublin, having finally gained Lord Grantham's blessing. Sybil (now pregnant) and Tom return to Downton after fleeing Ireland in the third series, where Sybil gives birth to a daughter but dies soon after due to eclampsia.

Matthew Crawley 

Matthew Reginald Crawley (played by Dan Stevens) (1885–1921) is a middle-class distant cousin of the Crawleys who becomes the heir to the estate in the first episode and soon after moves to Downton. He finds it difficult to reconcile the traditionalist, aristocratic lifestyle of Downton with his middle-class upbringing, but he is eventually accepted into the family and becomes something of a surrogate son to Lord Grantham. Matthew and Mary fall in love, but circumstances separate them, and Matthew becomes engaged to Lavinia Swire. Matthew is paralysed from the waist down while serving in the First World War, but, after a miraculous recovery and difficulty moving past Lavinia's death from Spanish flu, he and Mary wed in 1920. After a financial scare, Matthew becomes a co-owner of the estate, and begins working on plans to modernise it with the new agent, brother-in-law Tom Branson. In September 1921, Mary gives birth to their son George, but Matthew is killed in a car crash while driving home from the hospital. Following his death, his son George becomes the heir to the earldom, and a letter is found that serves as a will for Mary to inherit Matthew's share of Downton.

Matthew dies because his actor chose to leave the series. Julian Fellowes wanted to have Matthew die in series four, but the actor wanted to leave sooner. A Huffington Post poll revealed that 85% of the respondents expressed dislike of Matthew's death. Maureen Ryan of the Huffington Post stated that she believed Matthew's death was beneficial to the story as his storylines had grown repetitive.

Isobel Crawley 

Isobel Grey (formerly Crawley, née Turnbull), Lady Merton (played by Penelope Wilton) is Matthew's widowed mother. A recurring theme during the first two series is the clash between Isobel's more modern and liberal values with the traditionalist ideas of Lord Grantham and his family. Isobel, a former nurse, constantly takes up new charitable causes, helping run the convalescent home at Downton and assisting refugees and prostitutes, though her sense of moral imperative often irritates others. She maintains a quarrelsome rivalry with Violet, the Dowager Countess, but this eventually develops into a genuine friendship, especially after Isobel is grief-stricken by Matthew's unexpected death and Violet's brief illness. Isobel later receives a marriage proposal from Lord Merton, and despite a health scare and his sons' attempts to prevent the marriage, Isobel decides to marry him in the final series.

Lady Rosamund Painswick 

Lady Rosamund Painswick (née Crawley) (played by Samantha Bond) is Robert's widowed sister who lives on her own in London. She and her late husband, Marmaduke Painswick, had no children. Rosamund is one of the more headstrong and outspoken members of the family. She is devoted to Robert and his family and thus feels it is her duty to speak her mind on every possible occasion, though her interference in her nieces' decisions often has disastrous results. For example, Rosamund's influence causes complications and delays Mary and Matthew's engagement during the first two series. However, Rosamund also supports Edith throughout Edith's unplanned pregnancy and with finding a way to raise the child. The younger Crawleys often use Rosamund's home at 35 Belgrave Square as a place to stay when visiting London, on which occasions Rosamund takes the opportunity to catch up on family gossip.

Tom Branson 

Thomas Ferguson Niall Branson (played by Allen Leech) was initially the family chauffeur, employed in series one. He is an outspoken socialist, Irish nationalist and republican; during luncheons in the servants' hall, he had few qualms about espousing support for early Labour leader Keir Hardie. Tom develops feelings for Lady Sybil, with whom he shares political interests and a determined personality. After the First World War, Tom and Sybil receive Robert's reluctant blessing and marry in Dublin. However, in the third series, Tom and now-pregnant Sybil are forced to flee Ireland after Tom becomes implicated in the burning of an Anglo-Irish nobleman's house. Tom struggles both with grief over Sybil's death in childbirth and with being accepted by the Crawleys and their servants as a new member of the Crawley family. At the end of the third series, Tom becomes the land agent for the estate at Violet's suggestion, owing to having grown up on a farm in Ireland. He helps Matthew and Mary modernise Downton. However, Tom still feels he cannot fit in; during a house party at the beginning of series three, he finds conversations with the Crawley family's friends awkward, and his friendship with schoolteacher and fellow socialist Sarah Bunting (played by Daisy Lewis) causes tension with the Crawleys. At the end of series five, Tom decides to leave Downton for Boston, Massachusetts with his daughter, but he eventually changes his mind and returns permanently to Downton. Later in series six, Branson is instrumental in setting up Lady Mary with Henry Talbot, and in the series finale, goes in with Talbot on an automobile dealership.

Tom Branson was supposed to appear in only three episodes of the first series, and Branson was originally Yorkshire-born. Moreover, actor Leech wanted to audition for Thomas Barrow, but chose Branson. Leech's audition for the role convinced Julian Fellowes to expand his role and to transform Branson into an Irishman. Leech at first tried to develop a Yorkshire accent in an effort to prevent his character from becoming an Irish stereotype, but when he was persuaded that Tom would not become such, he used his native Irish accent.

Tom Branson plays a major role in the first feature film, saving the king's life and courting Lucy Smith, who is the daughter of Lady Maud Bagshaw, lady-in-waiting to Queen Mary and a cousin of the Crawleys.

In the second feature film, Tom weds Lucy Smith. He, Lucy and members of the Crawley family travel to the South of France, after discovering that the Dowager Countess was gifted a villa in the South of France and arranges for her great-granddaughter, Tom's daughter Sybbie Branson, to inherit it. Tom and Lucy later have a child of their own, a female, named Violet after the now deceased Dowager Countess of Grantham.

Martha Levinson 

Martha Levinson (played by Shirley MacLaine) is Cora's brash, outspoken, and wealthy American mother. Martha has a slightly strained relationship with her daughter Cora and frequently trades barbed insults with Violet. Martha sees herself as representing modernity, while Violet seems to represent the pre-war aristocratic world that is gradually becoming obsolete.

Harold Levinson 
Harold Levinson (played by Paul Giamatti) is Cora's younger brother. His peripheral involvement in the Teapot Dome scandal leads Martha to request that Lord Grantham appear before Congress to vouch for Harold's character late in series four – he escapes with only a reprimand. Harold then accompanies his mother to England in July 1923. While in England he makes the acquaintance of the Hon. Madeleine Allsopp. The two part on good terms, with Madeleine promising to write to Harold frequently.

Miss Sybil Branson 

Sybil "Sybbie" Branson, (b. late May 1920) is the daughter and only child of Tom Branson and the late Lady Sybil Branson (née Crawley). She is baptised as a Catholic in accordance with her father's wishes, despite her grandfather Robert's strong preference that she be christened into the Anglican faith. When she is older, she affectionately nicknames Robert "Donk" (much to his consternation) after playing a game of "Pin the Tail on the Donkey" with him. In series six, she and her father have left for America, only for them to return to stay at Downton in the third episode.

In the first film, she is seven years old and continues to be raised with her first cousins George and Caroline, at the estate. In the second feature film, Sybbie's great-grandmother, the Dowager Countess, names Sybbie as heir to her villa in the South of France, ensuring Sybbie a more equal social and financial standing with her cousins.

Master George Crawley 

George Matthew Crawley (born August 1921) is the son and heir of the late Matthew Crawley and Lady Mary Josephine Crawley. George's father Matthew is killed in a car crash the day of George's birth. Following his father's premature death, George becomes heir to his grandfather Robert and the Downton estate. Upon Robert's death, he will become the 8th Earl of Grantham, though Mary will speak for his interests until he comes of age.

In the first film, he is six years old and plays with his younger half-sister Caroline, and first cousins Sybbie and Marigold. In A New Era, now seven years old, he is seen playing with his young cousins. His mother later tells George that it was time for his bedtime, and about the sudden demise of his father Matthew, only moments after his birth. His paternal grandmother, Isobel, assures the dying Violet that she will ensure that George remembers his great-grandmother well.

Marigold Gregson 

Marigold (born c. late December 1922 or mid-January 1923) is the illegitimate child of the late Michael Gregson and Lady Edith Crawley, as a result of their hidden love affair. Marigold is born in Geneva, Switzerland and adopted by a Swiss couple. However, Lady Edith misses Marigold and decides to have Marigold grow up on the farm of Timothy Drewe, a sympathetic local farmer. Edith's repeated visits began to arouse the suspicion and anger of Drewe's wife. When news reaches the Crawleys confirming Michael Gregson's tragic death, Lady Edith tells a terribly distraught Mrs Drewe the truth, reclaims her daughter, and flees to London. Edith's mother Cora suggests that Edith bring Marigold back to Downton on the pretense that Edith is adopting her because the Drewes can no longer afford to raise her. When Edith marries Bertie Pelham, the Marquess of Hexham, Marigold moves with them to their new home at Brancaster Castle.

In the first film, set in 1927, Marigold is four or five years old and has returned to Downton with her mother and stepfather for the royal visit. She plays outside with her cousins Sybil and George, as the adults are having tea inside the Downton estate. At five or six years old, in 1928, she has donned braids and runs to ask her mother play with her one warm day.

Hugh MacClare, Marquess of Flintshire  
Hugh MacClare, Marquess of Flintshire (played by Peter Egan), is a Scottish nobleman nicknamed "Shrimpie" and married to Susan, the niece of Violet, the Dowager Countess of Grantham. They have three children, the youngest being Rose. In 1921, he hosts the Crawleys at Duneagle Castle, his family's Scottish estate. It becomes clear Shrimpie is deeply unhappy about his marriage to Susan. Full of regret, Shrimpie later privately confesses to Robert that he has to sell his estate to pay off debts and says that he admires Robert for thinking ahead and modernising Downton. He is appointed Governor of Bombay that year, and he and his wife travel to India. However, the two fail to resolve their marital problems, and agree to separate upon returning to England for Rose's wedding.

Lady Rose MacClare 

Lady Rose Aldridge (née MacClare) (portrayed by Lily James) (b. 1902) is the daughter and youngest child of Hugh and Susan MacClare (Lord and Lady Flintshire). During her visit to Violet in 1920, she unexpectedly joins Edith and Matthew on a trip to London, claiming that she is planning a surprise for her mother. When Violet tricks Rosamund into telling the truth – that Rose is meeting a married lover – she has Rose sent to Duneagle early, accompanied by her paternal aunt Agatha, whom she despises, as punishment.

In 1921, Rose's relationship with her mother has soured, though her relationship with her father is better. While her parents are posted to India, Rose stays at Downton, where she is living by 1922. Rose becomes restless and persuades Anna into accompanying her to a dance hall in York, where Anna attracts the attention of some young men but barely escapes when a fight ensues. Rose later becomes attracted to Sir John Bullock, a guest at a Downton house party with whom she later meets up in London along with some of her relatives. They go to the Lotus night club, but Bullock gets drunk and leaves Rose on the dance floor. She is rescued (to her relatives' dismay) by black singer Jack Ross. Rose secretly invites Ross and his band members to perform at Downton for Robert's birthday, by which time she has entered into a secret relationship with Jack. Though Jack loves her, he fears the repercussions of an inter-racial romance. Rose wants to marry Jack, though Mary sees that Rose's primary motivation is to upset her mother. Jack breaks off the relationship to protect Rose.

Rose's society debut is in 1923, when Cora presents her before the king, queen, and Prince of Wales. Rose befriends the prince's mistress, Freda Dudley Ward, who comes to her when a letter from the prince is stolen by Terence Sampson, a greedy acquaintance from Robert's club. The Crawleys and Rose succeed in retrieving the letter, after which the grateful prince unexpectedly arrives and opens Rose's debutante ball at their house, dancing with Rose.

Rose matures and become less self-centred. She volunteers with a charity in Leeds to help Russian refugees who have resettled in England. In 1924, she meets, falls in love with, and marries Atticus Aldridge, the Jewish son of Lord and Lady Sinderby. Between series five and series six they move to New York; sometime before Christmas 1925 they have a daughter named Victoria.

The Hon. Atticus Aldridge 
The Honourable Ephraim Atticus Aldridge (played by Matt Barber), more commonly known by his middle name, Atticus, is the son and heir of Lord and Lady Sinderby. He meets Lady Rose MacClare one stormy day in York in the spring of 1924, while she is leaving a pastry shop, and helps her with her packages. He goes with her to the church of St. Mary Magdalene, where Rose helps care for exiled Russians. He is initially reticent about his family, but mentions that his great-grandfather and his family were Russian Jews from Odessa who had emigrated to England during the 19th century and eventually anglicised their family name. After a confrontation with one of the Russian emigres, Count Rostov, which Rose witnesses, Atticus reveals his family had emigrated after being driven from Odessa in that city's 1859 and 1871 pogroms. Lord Sinderby was said to have been opposed to his marriage to Rose while his wife accepts her because "her son's happiness is more important".

Herbert "Bertie" Pelham, 7th Marquess of Hexham 
Herbert "Bertie" Pelham (played by Harry Hadden-Paton) first appears in the 2014 Christmas special "A Moorland Holiday" as the land agent of the Brancaster estate. He encounters Edith during a round of grouse shooting and keeps company with her during afternoon tea and the evening festivities. A quiet, unassuming and sensitive man devoid of any real ambition, he is a distant cousin to the current Marquess of Hexham, to whom he is very close. Bertie later encounters Edith in London and helps her with her all-night push to get her magazine to the printer. The pair see each other often in London during series six and they fall in love,

Bertie asks Edith to marry him the night of Charlie Rogers' death. Edith struggles with revealing the truth about Marigold to Bertie before accepting him. In the meantime, Bertie's unmarried cousin dies of malaria in Tangiers. This makes Bertie, as the nearest male heir, the new Marquess of Hexham. He refuses to assume his title publicly until his cousin's memorial service, though Carson instructs the Downton staff to address him as "Your Lordship" nonetheless. He arrives at Downton before leaving to settle his cousin's affairs, and Edith accepts his proposal. Before she can bring herself to tell him about Marigold, Mary peevishly reveals the truth. Bertie accepts that Edith has an illegitimate daughter, but he is also hurt that she may have tried to trick him, so he breaks off their engagement. In "The Finale", feeling guilty about ruining Edith's happiness, Mary arranges for Bertie and Edith to reunite at a restaurant. Bertie tells Edith that he misses her terribly and still wants to marry her. Edith accepts him, and they marry on New Year's Eve 1925.

In the first feature film, Bertie is asked by King George V to accompany him on a three-month tour of Africa. However, Edith reveals to him that she is pregnant, and the child's birth will coincide with Bertie's departure date. Unable to get out of his commitment himself, Bertie's mother-in-law Cora and Queen Mary intercede on his behalf.

Staff

Mr Carson 

Charles 'Charlie' Carson (played by Jim Carter), called Mr Carson by staff and Carson by the family, is the butler at Downton Abbey. Mr Carson is in charge of the pantry, wine cellar, and dining room, as well as the male staff, who report to him. He has worked at Downton since he was a young man, when his grandfather was its Head Groom. Beginning as a junior footman, he rose to become butler by 1890. He is a major figure in the community in his own right, as evidenced in series five when he is asked to chair a committee building a memorial to townsmen who died during the First World War.

He tends towards nostalgia and fears change (such as the installation of telephones in the house and electricity in the kitchen, as well as the election of a Labour government). He has a stern, but fatherly, disposition over the servants. He also has a special place in his heart for Lady Mary, given she was the first child born at Downton during his tenure as butler. He is one of the few people who is prepared to speak frankly to her, and is prepared to leave Downton Abbey to join her at Haxby when she is engaged to Sir Richard Carlisle. He only changes his mind when he learns more of Sir Richard's questionable moral character, and is clearly distressed by Lady Mary's reaction to his decision. It is he who eventually talks Lady Mary out of her listless grief over Matthew's death. She reacts callously at first, reminding him of his place, but soon comes to apologise, and finally breaks down and cries. Carson quickly steps forward to comfort her, and assures her she will always find a source of support in him. He has never condemned Mary for any of her more questionable actions, and Mrs Hughes once remarks that "Mr Carson would forgive (Lady Mary) if (she) attacked him with a brick."

For a brief time before entering into household service, Mr Carson was a music hall performer in the vaudeville duo the "Cheerful Charlies" alongside former friend Charlie Grigg. When this secret becomes known in Downton, Carson offers his resignation to Lord Grantham. Amused instead of scandalised at the revelation, Grantham gently declines Carson's offer, ending the matter as a non-issue.

In the second series, with most of the male staff depicted as serving in the First World War, Mr Carson finds himself under mostly self-imposed pressure to ensure household duties are carried out to his exacting standards. Carson is mortified when he suffers severe chest pains while serving the family dinner and as a consequence is forced to accept help from the female staff. After the war, with male staff able to be hired, the full household staff are brought up to the pre-war levels and Mr Carson is able to return to solely undertaking the duties of butler. It is revealed in series four that Carson almost married a young woman during his time as a performer but the woman chose Mr Grigg, the other half of the duo.

He has a close relationship with Mrs Hughes, built up over a quarter-century of overseeing the household staff. At the end of the series five Christmas special, Carson has purchased a house and added both his and Mrs Hughes's names to the registry, with the intention of asking Mrs Hughes to marry him; she accepts.

Series six deals with Carson's and Hughes' marriage and life as a married couple. Still a man of high standards, his reactions to Hughes' cooking lead to a comic incident where he is forced to cook dinner and fails, teaching him to respect her efforts. The final series also deals with Carson downsizing staff to adjust for the current times. In the series finale, Carson begins to suffer from palsy that ultimately forces him into semi-retirement. Barrow succeeds him as butler, with Carson serving in a supervisory role. 

In the first film, Carson is called back to oversee the royal family's visit to Downton. Mary is concerned that the royal staff is running roughshod over Barrow. Carson is reluctant to go along with the servants' plan to overpower the royal staff and take over serving the royal family, but ultimately agrees under prodding from Mrs Hughes. In the second film, Carson is scandalised that a silent film is being shot on the Downton estate and plans to oversee matters personally with the film people "to keep them in check". To prevent Carson embarrassing himself or the family, Mrs Hughes and Lady Mary conspire to have him join Lord Grantham's trip to the French villa instead.

Mrs Hughes 

Elsie May Carson (née Hughes) (played by Phyllis Logan) (b. 1862) is the housekeeper at Downton Abbey. The female servants report to her. Though unmarried, she is referred to as Mrs Hughes according to traditional titles for servants during the time period. She is originally from Argyll, Scotland, where her father was a farmer. Elsie worked as a maid at Duneagle Castle for an unknown period of time. She has one sibling, a sister who lives in Lytham St Annes. Mrs Hughes has described her sister as being born "not quite right in the head" and has been privately caring for her since their mother died. Before she came to Downton in 1895 as head housemaid, she was courted by a farmer, Joe Burns. But she refused him and he married a woman named Ivy and had a son, Peter. In 1913, three years after Ivy dies and his son joins the army, Joe comes to Downton and asks Elsie to marry him, but once again she refuses him, even though she has previously expressed doubts about choosing a life of service over having a husband and family.

Outwardly prim and somewhat strict in her manner as housekeeper, Mrs Hughes is essentially kindly and generous, as shown when she assists Ethel after she leaves her position and has a baby out of wedlock. In series three, she has a breast cancer scare; the lump is eventually diagnosed as benign. She is best friends with Mrs Patmore. She has developed a close relationship with Mr Carson; at the time the series begins, the two had overseen Downton's staff for almost 20 years. Although she is usually supportive of Mr Carson when it comes to matters of discipline, she is seldom afraid of speaking her mind when he makes decisions; Carson in turn dislikes proceeding with any choice without her approval. She also speaks frankly about her employers when she and Mr Carson are alone; she enjoys seeing the Dowager Countess (whom she calls "the old bat") getting her comeuppance with the arrival of Isobel Crawley. Unlike Carson, she privately views Lady Mary as a silly girl whose misfortune comes mostly from her own mistakes; her attitudes have likely softened over the years. She is one of Anna's closest allies, being the first person who helps her in the aftermath of Mr Green's attack. She also refused to hand the police the ticket regarding Mr Bates's trip to London on the day Mr Green died, telling Lady Mary she could never condemn a man for defending his wife's honour against such a crime. At the end of the series five Christmas special Mrs Hughes has accepted Mr Carson's marriage proposal. In series six she married Mr Carson, but continued to be addressed as Mrs Hughes regardless.

Fellowes initially intended for Mrs Hughes to be a Yorkshire native. However, when Logan auditioned for the role, the casting directors liked her Scottish accent so much that they decided to turn Mrs Hughes into a Scot.

John Bates 

John Bates (played by Brendan Coyle), who is mainly known as Mr Bates or just Bates, is Lord Grantham's valet. He previously served in the Army alongside the earl as his batman during the Boer Wars and suffered an injury to his right leg.

He arrives at Downton in the first episode to replace Lord Grantham's previous valet. When the staff see that he uses a cane, they are at best surprised and at worst angry feeling that they will have to pick up the slack for him, due to his disability slowing him down in the large house. Most of the staff give him the cold shoulder, while Thomas and O'Brien try to get rid of him to further their own ends. Only the housemaid Anna offers him any sympathy and friendship.

O'Brien, Cora's lady's maid, schemes to get Cora to talk to Lord Grantham about Bates's unsuitability. And while the household is lined up to receive a duke, O'Brien discreetly kicks Bates's cane on which he was leaning, knocking him on his face in the gravel, in order to cause a scene and bring attention to his disability. Lord Grantham, after being pressured by Cora and Carson to see how Bates is not fulfilling his job properly, regretfully tells Bates that it is not working out.

Carson's main complaint is that a valet should perform extra duties outside of just seeing to Lord Grantham, including carrying trays and acting as a third footman if necessary. Bates nearly begs to stay, pointing out that he is unlikely to find another position (because of his disability), but Lord Grantham is unmoved. However, when he sees the departing Bates leaving, Lord Grantham is overcome with feelings of guilt. He runs after the car and orders Bates to get out, telling him to get back inside and that nothing more would be said about him leaving.

Throughout much of the series Bates is at odds with Thomas, who tries to get rid of him so that he can take his place as valet. Bates tries to ignore him at first. Still being ignored by the rest of the staff save Anna, he gains an ally in William when he observes Thomas bullying the younger man, who is suffering with severe homesickness. An overconfident Thomas makes a snide remark that Mr Bates can do nothing to stop him only for Bates to violently grab him and shove him against the wall, proving that despite his disability he is not to be underestimated.

He and Anna fall in love, but he explains he has yet to divorce his estranged wife, Vera. Vera comes to Downton only to inform Bates that if he does not come away with her, she will sell the scandalous story of the death of Kemal Pamuk in Mary's bed to the newspapers, which could ruin the reputation of Downton Abbey. Bates goes with her, and it is thought that his romance with Anna is over.

He returns to Downton, having apparently settled affairs with his wife, but Miss O'Brien contacts Vera and once again, she returns to cause more trouble. She manages to stop the divorce that Mr Bates thought was a foregone conclusion, and he goes to London to confront her. After his return, he receives a telegram informing him of her death. It is revealed that she was poisoned by eating rat poison cooked in a pie, and Bates is put under suspicion.

Anna insists that they marry so that she will have legal rights if the worst happens. Bates is subsequently charged with murder. He is arrested in front of the entire Downton staff after Lavinia's funeral and is put on trial, during which some other staff members at Downton and Robert are called to testify. The evidence does not portray Bates in a good light; the jury finds him guilty of the murder of his wife, and he is sentenced to be hanged. Determined to prove him innocent, Anna and Robert try to appeal the decision and are successful in reducing Bates's sentence from execution to life imprisonment.

After visiting Bates in prison, Anna declares that she will not rest until Bates had been proven completely innocent and is free. She searches for anyone Vera may have been in contact with, and finds a neighbour who saw her the day of her death. The neighbour mentions she saw Vera cleaning crust from under her nails, confirming she made the pie herself. Although the neighbour at first recants her story, she eventually gives a statement that clears Bates, who is freed from prison, returns to Downton, and moves into a nearby cottage with Anna.

It is Bates who intervenes to save Thomas's prospects after he attempts to seduce Jimmy, as he is unwilling to see another man lose his livelihood due to the schemes of others. Deducing that Miss O'Brien is pressuring Jimmy to have Mr Carson demand Thomas leave Downton with no reference, he informs Lord Grantham of the details, and asks Thomas to give him a weapon to use against his former ally.

Bates then invite O'Brien to his cottage, and whispers the words "her ladyship's soap" in her ear, before warning her that unless she calls Jimmy off, he will not keep her secret. Bates remains ignorant of the true meaning of the words, but he soon has other concerns when Lord Grantham decides to appoint Thomas as under-butler to take advantage of his skills at cricket; Bates had only hoped to allow Thomas to leave with a good reference.

In series four, Anna is violently raped and Bates is confused and hurt at her attempts to push him away, as he is unaware of Anna's distress. He threatens Mrs Hughes with leaving Downton in order to find out what is wrong with his wife. She reveals the story of Anna's attack but states that the attacker was a stranger who broke into the house. He tells Anna he knows what has happened, and reassures her that he still loves her.

The two attempt to move past the attack, but both find it very difficult. Bates is suspicious that the attacker could be Mr Green, valet of Lord Gillingham. When Green returns to the Abbey, Bates is further convinced of his guilt. Bates goes to York for the day but does not reveal the reason for going and Mr Green dies in Piccadilly after "falling into the road". Mrs Hughes discovers a round-trip ticket stub from York to London in an article of Bates's clothing that Anna donates to charity. She gives it to Lady Mary, who destroys it after Bates uses his skills as forger and pickpocket in suppressing a royal scandal.

When a witness comes forward to claim Mr Green was murdered and the investigation reaches Downton, police question Bates and Anna on several occasions. This puts strain on the couple, as Anna is too frightened to ask John the truth of his trip to York. Matters become worse when Anna assists Lady Mary in procuring contraception for a sexual relationship with Lord Gillingham, and Bates finds the evidence and mistakenly believes his wife is using it so she does not become pregnant with a murderer's child.

Bates finally confronts Anna and reveals the truth; he realised Green was the attacker as soon as he returned to Downton, and he did intend to murder the valet the day he was killed. However, having bought the train ticket to London in York, he decided not to go through with the plan at the last minute, as he considered his actions would do far more harm than good, since he would certainly have been hanged for the crime if convicted; his love for his wife proved greater than his desire to defend her honour. Bates reveals that he kept the untorn ticket in his coat as a talisman for a time. Anna's attempts to locate the ticket prove fruitless, due to Lady Mary's prior actions. Bates is angered when Miss Baxter informs the police that he could have made it to London the day Green was killed, despite her making clear she could not swear on the evidence. Miss Baxter refuses to inform Bates that, as a convicted criminal herself, she had to speak honestly to avoid another prison sentence. However, the investigation into Green's death begins to wind down, as the police have failed to find anything more than circumstantial evidence to link Bates to the crime.

At the end of the series, Bates is livid as Inspector Vyner calls Anna into Scotland Yard as part of an identity parade. Although convinced that there is no evidence for anything to happen, Anna is later arrested for Green's murder. A distraught Bates along with Lady Mary is adamant that Anna will not be convicted or even go to trial.

During the Christmas episode, Bates visits Anna in prison where she reveals that a secret from her past could compromise any character witness statement the Crawleys make in her favour. Matters are made much worse when Murray confirms that her history, of which the police are now aware, would look convincingly to the police like Anna was capable of violence.

Anna is then given a trial date and Bates is forced into taking action. He leaves Downton, telling Carson in a letter that he has confessed to murdering Green in order to have Anna freed. He tells Robert in another letter how to contact him. Bates then disappears and is now on the run.

Molesley gains access to the Bateses cottage and finds a picture of Bates; he and Baxter use it as they travel around York's pubs to find out which pub Bates had been to the day Green died. A pub owner confirms that Bates was indeed in York and would swear to it, which clears him. However, it would endanger Anna once again, who is released on bail.

As Anna returns to Downton, Bates is still missing, leaving her miserable. At Christmas there is still no sign of him, but at the Christmas carol service Bates manages to sneak in; he surprises Anna, and pulls her away from the crowd. When she asks how it is possible that he has returned, he silences her, insisting that they speak later about it but for the moment, enjoy their Christmas. They kiss and enjoy their reunion.

In series six, Bates and Anna must deal with the shadow of Green's murder; however, the case is resolved quickly when a confession is made by another of Green's victims and Anna is freed from bail.

However, problems between the two are not over as Bates realises something has upset Anna. She tells him that she believed she was pregnant, but that she had miscarried, and that it had potentially happened twice before. Despite being upset that she kept it from him, he comforts her when she tells him she thinks she's let him down.

In episode 2, Bates discovers Anna yet again upset, after having told Lady Mary about her pregnancy problems. He asks her if she had ever considered adoption, but she tells him that the idea would never work for him nor her as they would want their own child. Bates believes they must be content as they are, but Anna continues to believe that she cannot give him what he needs. Bates does not accept this, and insists that she alone is enough for him.

In episode 2, without his knowledge, Anna visits Dr Ryder in London, who offers to perform a cervical stitch to rectify the problem with her carrying a child to term, but she must become pregnant again first. Anna returns to Downton in a lighter mood, which does not go unnoticed by Bates. He continues to notice the change in her mood after Anna tells Mary that she believes she is pregnant again.

Still in the dark about her pregnancy, Anna begins to experience pains in episode 4, for which Lady Mary rushes her down to London, claiming to Bates that the emergency is hers, not Anna's. However, Bates is not fooled, and when she returns to Downton, tells her he believes he knows what took them to London, believing the worst has happened. Anna, however, tells him that the news is nothing sad and that actually, she's pregnant and expecting their child. Bates is overjoyed by the news.

In episode 5, Bates is insistent that nothing will go wrong with the pregnancy, when Anna begins to worry. In episode 6 he insists on paying for Anna to have an appointment with Dr Ryder when she begins to experience lingering pains again, and asks that she stop keeping him in the dark. Despite the pains, Anna is fine, as her body is adjusting to pregnancy. Bates becomes protective over Anna at the car racing at Brooklands, when she insists in running after Lady Mary after a fatal crash on the track. His protectiveness leads Baxter to discover Anna's pregnancy.
Whilst Anna is pregnant, Bates continues to attempt selling his mother's house in London as well as purchasing a house in the north.

Bates does not say much about his family or childhood, though he does mention that his late mother was Irish and he has a Scottish grandmother.

Anna Bates 

Anna May Bates (née Smith) (played by Joanne Froggatt) (b. 1886) is lady's maid to Lady Mary at Downton Abbey; previously she was first parlour maid and head housemaid. She is 26 at the beginning of the series. She is very trustworthy, polite, and loyal to the Crawley family and her "downstairs" co-workers. Anna was the member of staff who helped Lady Mary and her mother Cora carry the corpse of Kemal Pamuk out of Lady Mary's bedroom and was the only one who openly welcomed valet John Bates to the household, despite everyone else's initial prejudice against him on account of his limp. After a long and somewhat secretive courtship she married Mr Bates in the end of the second series in a private ceremony at a registrar's office. Lady Mary prepares a room for Anna and her husband in the main house so they can spend their wedding night together. After her wedding, to avoid confusion with her husband, Anna is still called by her first name by the staff and family, unlike standard practice for lady's maids of the time.

Shortly after their wedding night, Bates is arrested for murdering his previous wife, although Anna and the rest of the residents at Downton are convinced that he is innocent. When Bates is deemed guilty and is sentenced to be hanged, Anna breaks down and briefly prepares to leave Downton Abbey with Lady Mary, whom she is very close to, offering to accompany her mistress on an extended holiday to America, much to Mary's delight. When the Crawleys manage to reduce Bates's sentence to life imprisonment, she decides to stay at Downton, although she vows that she will not rest until Bates is free. Anna is promoted from head housemaid to Lady's Maid to Mary during Bates's incarceration. During the time apart from Bates, Anna refuses to fall into hopelessness or despair, though there is a brief period where this wavers, when letters and visits with her husband are stopped for a time. Her efforts to prove her husband's innocence become a success when a neighbour of Vera's inadvertently tells Anna details of their last meeting which prove that Vera committed suicide in order to have her husband convicted and hanged for the crime. Bates is freed, and the reunited married couple move into a cottage on the grounds shortly thereafter.

In the third episode of the fourth series, Anna is violently assaulted and raped by Lord Gillingham's valet while the rest of family members and staff are attending a concert above stairs in the house. Anna only tells Mrs Hughes of the crime, fearing her husband would commit murder if he discovered the truth. She becomes distant from everyone, and is unable to even bear Mr Bates's touch, as she confesses to Mrs Hughes that she feels she no longer deserves him, and feels unclean. She decides to move back into Downton Abbey, leaving Mr Bates hurt and confused. Soon, however, Mrs Hughes tells Mr Bates what happened to Anna, although she refuses to disclose who was the culprit. Mr Bates reassures Anna that nothing will change between them, and that he will always support her. The two try to continue their lives; however, both find it difficult to look past what has happened. Mr Green briefly returns to Downton, and Lady Mary persuades Lord Gillingham to dismiss him, although she does not give him a reason. Anna worries that Mr Bates will have his revenge if her attacker's identity is ever revealed. Bates one day sets off to York alone, and returns the same day, and the family soon learn that Mr Green died in London that day, after falling under a bus. Anna is frightened that Bates discovered the truth and took his revenge.

When a witness comes forward to claim Mr Green was murdered, the investigation causes Anna to fear Bates was responsible, but she is too frightened to confront him, as it will confirm the identity of her attacker. Anna then assists Lady Mary with procuring contraception for a sexual relationship with Lord Gillingham, but Bates finds the evidence and mistakenly believes Anna has been using it so she does not become pregnant with a murderer's child. Bates finally confronts his wife and reveals the truth; he realised Green was the attacker as soon as he returned to Downton, and he did intend to murder the valet the day he was killed. However, having bought the train ticket to London in York, he decided not to go through with the plan at the last minute, as he considered his actions would do far more harm than good, since he would certainly have been executed had he been convicted. Overjoyed that her husband is once again innocent, Anna then attempts to locate the untorn ticket to London, as Bates kept it in his coat as a talisman for a time, and its existence would prove Bates could not have been in London when Green was killed. She is forced to accept defeat in this, not knowing that Lady Mary had already destroyed the ticket, as she wrongly believed it proved Bates's guilt. However, the investigation into Green's death begins to wind down, as the police have failed to find anything more than circumstantial evidence to link Bates to the crime. The overjoyed couple once again begin to discuss and plan their future.

Inspector Vyner of Scotland Yard returns to Downton and informs Anna and Bates that they have discovered that Green attacked several women. They had been too scared to come forward before but had now stepped forward and informed the police of his actions. He also reveals that Bates is no longer a suspect, as the person seen talking to Green appeared to be shorter than him. Vyner then asks that Anna visit Scotland Yard for further questions during the Crawleys' stay in London. Anna and Bates both visit Scotland Yard where Anna is forced to be part of an identity parade to which Bates is outraged. Later, having returned to Grantham House, Mrs Hughes interrupts Anna and Lady Mary and informs them that Vyner has returned and has come to arrest her. Vyner tells Mary and Anna that the witness has confirmed that they had seen Anna on the pavement near Green in Piccadilly when the incident occurred. Shocked, Anna is cuffed as Mary, Robert and Bates attempt to plead her case but to no use. As Bates is left helpless, Anna is escorted away to the police station having been arrested on suspicion of Green's murder. Later, at the memorial, Mary speaks to Bates, certain that Anna will not be convicted, and feels there will not even be a trial, as the police have nothing to go on. Bates is less sure, but agrees that Anna will not be convicted.

During the 2014 Christmas special, Anna awaits trial in prison as Mary and Bates visit her. More is revealed about Anna's past. During a conversation with Bates, Anna tells him that something in her history could stack against her in a court case. She reveals that her father died when she was about six years old and that her mother remarried, of which Bates already knew, however Anna had not told him the whole story. It is implied that her stepfather was a drunkard and abusive, touching her in inappropriate ways whilst she was young. When she feared what he might do next and knew what was about to happen, Anna hid in the dark, waiting for him with a knife. She struck him; however, she did not kill him, merely wounded him.
Anna's mother managed to convince police that it was an accident and he had slipped, but Anna is now terrified that either the police have found a file on the incident or her stepfather had heard of her arrest and tipped them off and it would be used to disprove the Crawleys' character reference of her and portray her as violent. Matters are not made better when the Crawleys' lawyer, Murray, confirms that things do not look good for Anna and Bates is forced into action when a trial date for Anna is set. Bates then leaves Downton, writing in a letter to Carson that he is going to confess to murdering Green in order for Anna to be freed. He writes to Robert also with an address attached so he can be contacted. However both Molesley and Baxter investigate Bates's confession and find the pub he claims he was at in York the day Green died, and a witness confirms Bates was indeed in York. They then take this to Robert who ensures that the witness makes a statement, then tries to contact Bates. Anna is freed but on bail whilst her husband is classified as being on the run. She returns to work as Mary's lady's maid but is alone until Christmas. During the Crawleys' Christmas celebrations, Anna is seen alone and concerned about her husband. However at the very end, Mrs Patmore notices a familiar face has snuck into the room. Bates sneaks up behind Anna, surprising her, then pulls her aside. A shocked Anna begins to ask how the case is sorted out but Bates silences her, saying they will speak of it later. The episode ends with Anna and Bates sharing a Happy Christmas alone.

At the beginning of series six Anna is in a dark place as the case of Green's death lingers over her and Bates as she's still out on bail. However, relatively quickly, the mystery is solved as another of Green's victims comes forward and confesses to his murder. Problems for Anna, however, continue.
After discussing Edith's child, Marigold, at the servants dinner, Bates notices she has become subdued. Anna reveals to him that she believed she was pregnant, but that morning had realised that she had miscarried their child, and that it wasn't the first time it had happened, but the third. Distraught in believing that it is impossible for her to carry a child to term, Anna becomes upset, believing she had let Bates down. He tries to convince her that despite wanting children, she alone is enough for him, which she has trouble accepting.

Anna later tells Mary of her troubles. Mary offers to take Anna to London, paying for her to visit Dr Ryder, the doctor that had treated Mary for problems when she had trouble conceiving a child with Matthew.
Ryder informs Anna that he has identified the problem and that she has a common issue of having cervical incompetence, a condition which results in a baby becoming too heavy for the womb to support after about three months, but also tells her that the condition is easily treatable with cervical cerclage, a stitch inserted into the womb after a woman has been pregnant for about 12 weeks; however, it does not always work.
Anna returns to Downton but chooses not to inform Bates of the news until she becomes pregnant again and the stitch has worked, so as not to get his hopes up.
In episode 3, Mary asks if Anna has considered Dr Ryder's advice. Anna reveals that she's already pregnant again. However, in episode 4 she begins to suffer severe cramps and fears she is suffering another miscarriage. Mary, claiming the emergency to be for herself, rushes Anna to London to see Ryder and manages to get there in time to save the baby. When they return, Bates knows that it was she, not Mary that had the medical emergency; however, this time she tells him that the news is happy and that she is in fact pregnant, to which Bates is overjoyed.
Whilst Anna is pregnant, she still fears that as there are months to wait, the baby is still in danger of being lost, despite her husband's insistence that nothing will go wrong.
In episode 6 Anna begins to experience uncomfortable pains again and Bates insists he pay for her to see Ryder again. However, the pains are nothing to worry about, as it's just her body adjusting to the pregnancy. In episode 7, after the accident at the car racing in Brooklands, Anna rushes after Mary, Bates warns her not to do so "in her condition" and he asks Baxter to go after her. That leads Baxter to guess that Anna is pregnant.
Anna and Bates also continue the plan to sell Bates's mother's London house in order to purchase a house up north and hire it out.

The rest of Anna's pregnancy goes seemingly without a hitch.
In "The Finale", the final episode of the series and of the show, Anna is shown to be pregnant and still working as a ladies maid, much to the dislike and discomfort of Carson, who feels a woman in "her condition" should not be working.
Time skips to 29 December 1925, and Anna is shown to be close to giving birth. When Lady Rose returns to Downton, having had a child of her own, and asks when the baby is due, Anna reveals that she is about ten days away from her due date.
Despite the concern of her husband and of Lady Mary, Anna does keep working, although some of her duties are undertaken by other members of staff.
Whilst Anna is in Lady Mary's bedroom after the wedding of Lady Edith and Bertie Pelham, her waters unexpectedly break. Mary insists that Anna shouldn't return to her and Bates's cottage and instead allows Anna to stay in her room to have her baby.
Anna gives birth to a healthy baby boy on New Year's Eve, much to her and her husband's delight.
Mary tells the Bateses that their newborn son is welcome to stay at Downton's nursery during the day, as Anna wants to continue working at Downton, and that soon their son will be joined by a child of her own, as Mary is now pregnant.
During the New Year celebrations, the Bateses welcome the new year away from the others, together with their newborn son.

Erin La Rosa of BuzzFeed stated that the rape was "all pretty uncharacteristic for Downton Abbey, and all terribly upsetting." Emily Orley, also of Buzzfeed, argued that the storyline of the rape of Anna had too much focus on the male characters.

Thomas Barrow 

Thomas Barrow (played by Robert James-Collier) is under-butler at Downton Abbey and is a character who creates many conflicts.

Maureen Lee Lenker of Entertainment Weekly described Barrow as one of the series' "most polarizing figures".

He starts his employment there in 1910 as a junior footman. Thomas tells O'Brien that his father was a clockmaker. He constantly hatches schemes with O'Brien, intending to have Bates removed from service at Downton. When Bates catches him stealing some wine, Thomas attempts to frame him for the theft. Bates, however, manages to prove his innocence.

Thomas is a closeted gay man. In series one, he tries to blackmail his former lover, The Duke of Crowborough. Later, when Kemal Pamuk, an Ottoman diplomat, visits Downton, Thomas attempts to kiss him. Pamuk rebuffs him and later uses this incident to blackmail Thomas, threatening to inform Lord Grantham about his indiscretion unless Thomas agrees to guide Pamuk to the room of Lady Mary later that same evening. Thomas also leads on the kitchen maid, Daisy, partly for his amusement (since it annoys the second footman, William Mason, who has feelings for her) and for ulterior motives. He manipulates Daisy in order to further his plans to have Mr Bates ousted. At the end of series one, William punches Barrow for his cruel remarks regarding Lady Grantham's miscarriage and the death of William's mother. Shortly beforehand, Thomas signs up to the Royal Army Medical Corps in an effort to avoid being sent to the frontline for the war that is soon coming.

In series two, in the First World War, Thomas has ended up on the battlefield despite his attempts to avoid it, and has become terrified by the conflict. He purposefully puts his hand in the line of fire in order to gain a blighty wound and be sent home. Upon his return to Britain, he gets permission to work at Downton as sergeant in charge when the residence is made into a centre of recovery for injured officers.

When the war ends, Thomas tries to make a profit by taking advantage of the nationwide rationing by selling goods on the black market. This scheme fails, however, when he is sold worthless goods and is rendered penniless. He returns to Downton as first footman although, as always, he plans to move up to a higher position in the house staff. During Bates's murder trial, Thomas applies for Bates's old job, but is rejected by Lord Grantham. He hides the Crawley family dog, Isis, whom he hopes to "find" to curry favour with Lord Grantham. However, when he goes to reclaim the dog, he discovers her missing, and in his panic trying to find her in the woods, trips on several fallen branches and becomes muddied. On returning home, relieved to find that Isis is safe, he learns from Grantham that some children had found and returned the dog, seemingly ruining Thomas' plan. However, his physical dishevelment deceives Grantham into thinking that Thomas has more concern for the family than Grantham believed, and Grantham later tells Carson that he is willing to give Thomas a try as valet.

In the third series, Thomas and O'Brien's alliance begins to fall apart with the appointment of her nephew Alfred as footman. When O'Brien seeks to assist Alfred by enlisting Thomas' support, he refuses to help tutor him, irritated that someone else should progress rapidly when he spent years trying to reach his position. Thomas is then attracted to the handsome new footman, Jimmy, and walks into his room and kisses the sleeping Jimmy. He is caught by Alfred, who walks in on this scene and eventually tells Mr Carson at O'Brien's insistence. O'Brien then preys on Jimmy's discomfort and embarrassment to have him blackmail Mr Carson into sacking Thomas without a reference, otherwise Jimmy will go to the police. Mr Bates, to Thomas's surprise, intervenes, by informing Lord Grantham of the details and then offering to force O'Brien to call Jimmy off. Thomas provides Bates with words that lead her to believe Bates knows of her hand in Lady Grantham's miscarriage, and she quickly backs down. Although Bates had hoped Thomas would leave with a good reference, Lord Grantham decides to let him stay on so Thomas can lend his skills to the upcoming cricket match between the village and the house. After Thomas excels in the match, Lord Grantham decides to keep him on in the new position of under-butler, much to Bates' consternation since Barrow now nominally outranks him.

In the second Christmas special, Thomas, now known mostly as Mr Barrow, participates in the Tug-of-War match for the Downton side. When they win, Barrow follows Jimmy who, having won a large bet, has too much to drink. Barrow finds Jimmy just as he is cornered by two members of the opposing team, and puts himself in the way so Jimmy can avoid being beaten and mugged. Barrow is badly beaten instead. While he is recuperating, Jimmy comes to speak with him. Barrow accepts that Jimmy can never give him what he wants, so they instead agree to be friends.

In series four, Barrow is as shocked as anyone when his old ally Miss O'Brien leaves Downton in the middle of the night. He comes to dislike the new nanny for the two young children of Downton, and refuses to pass on her instructions to other members of staff. He informs Lady Grantham that he suspects the new nanny may be mistreating the children in some way. This suspicion leads to Lady Grantham's discovering the nanny's cruelty to Sybbie Branson, resulting in her immediate sacking. Barrow then attempts to gain an ally in the form of Lady Grantham's new maid Edna, a maid fired from Downton following her attempt to seduce Tom Branson, by claiming that Edna's accidental damage to one of Lady Grantham's favourite garments was in fact due to Anna Bates. However, this alliance does not last very long, as Edna is fired after she successfully seduces Tom Branson but is foiled in her effort to blackmail him into marrying her. She insults Barrow's arrogance and manner, though he responds in kind, and she leaves Downton once again.

Thomas is well aware that Lord Grantham and Carson are only keeping him on sufferance. When Barrow is set to be laid off, he attempts to find suitable employment and fails. He attempts suicide but is rescued by his friends. He eventually takes a position in a smaller household, but when Carson develops an illness, Barrow is invited back to Downton to become the new butler.

Lenker states that the character is initially "a solid villain" but develops and "he gradually became one of the most beloved members of the Crawley family staff".

Thomas was originally meant to be written out of the show at the end of the first series once he had had his "comeuppance". However, after James-Collier had filmed the first two episodes of the show the producers contacted his agent and asked if he would like to be optioned for the second and third series.

Sarah O'Brien 

Sarah O'Brien (played by Siobhan Finneran), who is mainly known as Miss O'Brien by the other servants or just O'Brien by the family, was Lady Grantham's lady's maid, a post she has held since 1910. She is especially bitter and resentful towards most of the other servants, perhaps due to her family circumstances; the animosity is common knowledge, even for the Crawleys. She had one favourite brother who had shell shock and later died during the Great War. She uses her position to curry favour with Lady Grantham to consolidate her influence, although her actions usually benefit them both. Although scheming in nature and always looking to manipulate circumstances to her and Thomas's benefit, she has a conscience and softens up over the second series. She is one of the few servants who smoke on a regular basis. This is at a time when most women did not smoke and it was very rare for a woman to be seen smoking in public.

O'Brien and Thomas were the only servants who never did like Bates and the duo constantly try to find faults and uncover his past in an attempt to force Mr Carson to sack him. She tells Bates's vengeful estranged wife Vera about the family's dirty secrets in an attempt to force Bates out and Vera uses that to blackmail Bates. In the last episode of series one, O'Brien comes to believe that Cora is going to replace her. Out of spite, she leaves a bar of soap on the bathroom floor while Cora is taking a bath. When Cora gets out, she slips on the soap, causing her to miscarry. O'Brien is wracked with guilt, and following the incident, she becomes even more loyal and devoted to Cora. When Thomas decides to buy extra food and supplies on the black market to sell to Downton's kitchen staff, she refuses to get involved in his business, but she sympathises with Thomas after he realises he has been swindled. After Lady Grantham is struck by a severe case of Spanish flu, O'Brien maintains a bedside vigil, attempting to atone for the miscarriage. Towards the end of the second series, she becomes guilt-ridden when she finds out her meddling in Bates's private life has started a chain reaction which led to Vera's threatening to expose the family secrets and bring the Crawley family into disrepute. O'Brien is one of several servants asked to testify at Bates's trial and is genuinely relieved when they learn that Bates had been reprieved. She also has a nephew, Alfred Nugent, who later becomes a footman at Downton. When it is revealed the new valet, Henry Lang, had shell shock, she was uncharacteristically sympathetic towards him and it was revealed that her own brother suffered from it due to the War.

In the second Christmas special, she accompanies Lady Grantham to Scotland to visit Duneagle Castle. While there, she apparently comes to like Lady Flintshire and manages to arrange to become her lady's maid. She leaves Downton at the very beginning of the fourth series in the middle of the night to take her new position, leaving only a letter to explain her actions. In series five, Mrs Hughes tells Mr Carson that O'Brien has left Lady Flintshire to serve as lady's maid to the wife of the new governor of the Bombay Presidency in British India.

Finneran stated that the character "is a thoroughly despicable human being", and that "People actually love that she’s a nasty piece of work. They love to dislike her." Finneran stated her belief that O'Brien's negative attitudes originated from how the character "has basically sacrificed her entire life to somebody else, for the good of their life and their home — it’s no wonder that she would get frustrated or angry about things." Finneran believed that O'Brien "was great to play."

Alexander Chee of The New Republic described O'Brien as the show's "best, most complex villain" and stated that her departure made the show less interesting. Jen Chaney of Vulture ranked O'Brien as the series' second most "despicable" character.

Executive producer Gareth Neame stated that Finneran had chosen to leave the series. Finneran herself confirmed this.

Daisy Parker 

Daisy Parker (formerly Mason (née Robinson)) (played by Sophie McShera) is the kitchen maid, later assistant cook, at Downton. Timid by nature, other characters frequently take advantage of her naivete or pull rank by tricking her or handing her the more undesirable and menial tasks. She is one of eleven children and her parents are deceased. She was forced to leave school at the age of 11.

In the first series, she is shown to have feelings for first footman Thomas, something that Mrs Patmore tries to discourage as she can see that Thomas is "not a ladies' man". After being caught stealing a bottle of wine, Thomas takes advantage of her feelings for him to persuade her to tell Mr Carson and Mrs Hughes that she saw Mr Bates take the wine. She later retracts the statement as she feels guilty and over time, her feelings for Thomas diminish and she notices that Downton's other footman, William, likes her. She is unsure how to handle the situation, especially when he is drafted during the First World War and convinces himself that she is his sweetheart. She decides, with some encouragement from Mrs Patmore, to allow William his fantasy to boost his morale in battle and gives him a photo. After William is severely injured saving Matthew Crawley during the Battle of Amiens, Daisy agrees to marry him to give him some happiness in his life but is widowed six hours later. She resists claiming her widow's pension as she thinks it wrong to claim money for marrying a man that she liked but would have not married under normal circumstances. William's father reaches out to her and Daisy tries to tell him about her guilt but he refuses to listen. The older Mr Mason later explains to Daisy that William was his only surviving child and he had realised that William married Daisy not just because he cared for her but so his father would have someone to keep company. Upon learning that her parents are dead, he offers to take her under his wing as a surrogate daughter, which she accepts, though reluctantly at the outset. Eventually, she does grow close to him and learns he wishes to name her his sole heir.

Daisy has a close relationship with Mrs Patmore, the cook, which is frequently more mother-daughter than two servants working together. At other times, Mrs Patmore becomes flustered and takes her frustration out on Daisy. She is also entrusted with teaching Lady Sybil how to cook, something which the pair enjoy. In 1919, she asks Mrs Patmore if, after many years in service, she can be promoted from kitchen maid to assistant cook and Mrs Patmore agrees to ask Mrs Hughes if the budget can support promotion for Daisy.

In the third series, she grows to like Alfred but resents Ivy, the new kitchen maid, who steals Alfred's attention. By series four the love triangle is getting nowhere until Alfred decides to leave after catching Ivy kissing Jimmy. Daisy is devastated and blames Ivy. She decides to avoid seeing him when he comes to say final goodbyes, but her father-in-law, whom she goes to see, convinces her she must say goodbye to him. When she does, Alfred apologises to her, regretting being blinded by his infatuation for Ivy and failing to see how good and true Daisy had been to him. Daisy admits she loved Alfred, but that is gone and they need to go their separate ways. They agree to be friends forever. In 1923 Harold Levinson apparently takes a liking to Daisy's cooking, and his valet Ethan Slade offers Daisy a position so she can come to America and work for him. She declines.

In series six, she gets irate when her father-in-law loses his tenancy on a nearby estate. For her explosion of anger, she almost loses her job, but Cora, who understands her frustration and anger, talks Carson into letting her stay. She works unstintingly and unflaggingly to remedy what happened. Her efforts are rewarded when her father-in-law is offered the tenancy of Yew Tree Farm, located in the Downton estate. At first, she is afraid of losing both Mrs Patmore and her father-in-law, when they begin to see one another, however, after reassurance from both of them that they will always love her, she changes her mind.

In the final episode of the series, she falls for Andy Parker, the new footman who has been helping at Mr Mason's farm. She gets a new hairstyle and announces that she will move into Yew Tree Farm with Mr Mason, while still working at Downton.

In the 2019 film she and Andy have become engaged, but she shows little enthusiasm for marriage. When she discovers that Andy sabotaged a pump because he thought she was flirting with a plumber, she assures him that she was not, and admits that she is impressed by his strength of feeling. She later tells Mrs Patmore that she is ready to start planning her wedding to Andy.

In the second feature film, Daisy and Andy are married and both living on the farm with Mr Mason.

Mrs Beryl Patmore 

Beryl Patmore (played by Lesley Nicol) is the cook at Downton. Mrs Patmore is in charge of the kitchen and kitchen staff. She takes great pride in her cooking and is a perfectionist in the kitchen. When the food does not meet her exacting standards, she takes her frustration out on the maids, especially Daisy. Throughout the first series she is often seen bossing around and shouting at Daisy while working but cares for her like a daughter and often offers her advice. She also seems to have protective feelings towards Daisy when she suspects that some of the other staff such as Thomas or Miss O'Brien are trying to make a fool or take advantage of her. Occasionally her caring attitude may become even counterproductive, as when she advises that Daisy should not sacrifice that much of her spare time to try to self-educate herself, as she sees that hopes for that kind of lifestyle which would justify such efforts are set too high considering Daisy's chances to move in the social hierarchy of that era.

Mrs Patmore tries to hide her deteriorating eyesight but Lord Grantham decides to send her to Moorfields in London for treatment when she accidentally puts salt on the pudding instead of sugar. This eyesight problem is declared to be cataracts, the surgery for which is new and daunting to Mrs Patmore, but the operation is successful and she regains the full use of her eyesight. During the Great War she learns that her nephew Archibald "Archie" Philpotts deserted and was shot for cowardice at the front. Hence, she becomes sensitive and upset when confronted with the topic of war.

She receives some money from a deceased family member, purchases a cottage in the nearby community of Haughton-le-Skerne and opens a Bed and Breakfast, hiring her niece, Lucy to help her. At first, it is considered to be a "house of ill repute" (as her first customers turned out to be an adulterous couple), but with the aid of her employers, who take tea there, that image is dispelled once and for all.
She also begins to see Albert Mason, Daisy's father in law, and between the two of them, help Daisy to realise that no matter what happens with them, they will always be there for Daisy, and that they love her very much. This helps Daisy drop any objections she has about their pairing.

William Mason 
William Mason (played by Thomas Howes) (d. 1918) was the second footman at Downton. His father was a local farmer and William used to help with the horses. William had three brothers and a sister but all died at or shortly after birth, leaving him as the only child. His mother died of illness towards the end of the first series. Affable and good-natured, he was also a competent pianist (actor Thomas Howes is a pianist) and would entertain other servants during their free time. During the first series he had strong feelings for Daisy.

In the second series, William wanted to enlist in the Army but was forbidden by his father, as he was the only other surviving member of the family. The Dowager Countess learns of his situation and tells the doctor that William had an embarrassing skin condition in order to keep him from being drafted. He was further humiliated after being handed a white feather at a benefit concert held in the Crawley mansion. After being informed that this story was untrue by Isobel Crawley, the doctor corrected the report to the War Department, and William is drafted shortly thereafter. William asked Daisy if she would give him a photo that he could carry with him. Daisy was worried about being William's sweetheart but Mrs Patmore urged her not to send him to the front with a broken heart, saying that if she refused, he would never return.

Fearing for his safety, Lord Grantham had him assigned to Matthew Crawley's battalion to be his batman. During the Battle of Amiens, he threw himself in front of Matthew to shield him from a shell explosion and both men were seriously wounded. He was hospitalised in Leeds as Downton, then used as a convalescent home, was only for officers, but William's father could not afford to leave his farm or repeatedly travel to and fro to visit. After failing to persuade Dr Clarkson to "bend the rules", a furious Violet manages to pull some strings to have William sent back to Downton, where he was cared for by Lady Edith. After being told he would not make it, William proposes to Daisy and tells her that he wants to marry her, not just out of love, but also to secure her a widow's pension so that she would be taken care of. Violet convinces the local parish vicar to officiate the bedside wedding ceremony and attends along with Lady Edith and the entire staff present. He dies hours later.

Later on, his father and Daisy become quite close.

Alfred Nugent 
Alfred Nugent (played by Matt Milne) was the new footman brought on to replace William Mason and is introduced in series three. His aunt is Sarah O'Brien, who brings him forward as a candidate for the empty post based on his previous experience as a waiter at a hotel. He is extremely tall, which Carson comments is almost too much, even though height is a desirable aspect for a footman. Almost immediately, Daisy Mason falls head-over-heels in love with Alfred, but is impeded by the new kitchen maid, Ivy Stuart, whom Alfred is quick to develop a crush on. He often helps Ivy in the kitchen with his culinary skills, much to Daisy's ire.

Alfred's largest rival is fellow footman Jimmy Kent, who is shorter than Alfred, but quite handsome. They are both in competition for the top position of first footman, which Jimmy is constantly sabotaging Alfred for. But because Ivy has a crush on Jimmy, Alfred decides to confront Jimmy about the fact that he's not interested in her. When he pushes into Jimmy's room, he catches Thomas Barrow in the act of trying to kiss Jimmy. Horrified, Alfred is pressured by his aunt, O'Brien, to report the incident to Carson, as homosexuality is considered a crime at this time. Poor Alfred is used as a pawn in his aunt's scheming, which eventually comes to nothing. In the series three Christmas Special, he tries to call Jimmy off his aggressive streak towards Thomas, and then spends the rest of the episode talking about his interest in cooking. In series Four, Alfred pursues that interest and leaves Downton to become a chef at the Ritz.

Also in series four, Alfred is still caught up in the downstairs "love square". He is in love with Ivy, who is in love with Jimmy, while Daisy is in love with Alfred and determined to break them up. It takes Alfred too long to realise that Daisy was the better match, and only tries to approach her when he comes back to the Abbey after leaving for his cooking course. Daisy initially tried to avoid seeing Alfred at all, but eventually speaks to him and wishes him well as a friend. In the Christmas Special, she receives a letter from Alfred, implying that they keep in touch.

James "Jimmy" Kent 

Jimmy Kent (played by Ed Speleers) was one of two new footmen introduced in series three, after the end of World War I. Before the war, he worked for Lady Anstruther and was her favourite footman. He first appears onscreen after Lord Grantham has given Carson permission to hire another footman in addition to Alfred Nugent. Turning up in the servants' hall unannounced, his good looks and charm quickly impress a number of the maids—as well as Thomas Barrow, currently valet to Lord Grantham. Thomas is quickly drawn to Jimmy, whose flirty and vague behaviour leads him to believe that Jimmy might be interested in sharing a homosexual relationship. Sarah O'Brien, who is angry with Thomas for the way he has treated her nephew, Alfred, quickly latches on to this dynamic and uses it to her own ends. Through careful manipulation of both Thomas and Jimmy, O'Brien crafts a situation in which Thomas is caught publicly making a move on Jimmy, who reacts in fear and anger, as male homosexuality was still illegal in the 1920s. Jimmy continues to be manipulated against Thomas by O'Brien, while John Bates and Elsie Hughes work to protect Thomas from the fallout. At the end of series three, Jimmy is promoted to first footman, but he holds a grudge against Thomas into the Christmas Special. At that time, it is inferred that Jimmy has kept up appearances by teasing Thomas and giving him a very clear cold shoulder that even Alfred notices is extreme. Alfred also notes that Thomas always defends Jimmy no matter how unkindly Jimmy behaves, and suggests that perhaps he take it easy. Jimmy ignores this advice and continues to behave recklessly, winning a large bet at the village fair only to spend most of it on alcohol. The toughs who lost the bet follow drunk Jimmy underneath a quiet bridge and jump him. Jimmy is only rescued by Thomas, who had been following him to keep an eye out. Thomas tells Jimmy to run, while Thomas is left to take the beating in Jimmy's place. When Jimmy returns with Dr. Clarkson and the other fair-goers, they find Thomas beaten and bloody. Thomas does not admit to the others why he was attacked, and only sends a significant stare to Jimmy, who is guilt-stricken with the truth. Later, he confronts Thomas about what happened, and though he is hesitant, eventually agrees to be friends. After that, the two of them are often seen in one another's company. Their increased companionship is suggested by showing Jimmy often with a cigarette.

In series four, Jimmy is something of an antagonist, stirring the pot for amusement and to get at Alfred, his professional rival. Because Alfred quickly becomes enamored with the new kitchen maid, Ivy Stuart, Jimmy also takes an interest. Daisy Mason, who is interested in Alfred, repeatedly tries to sabotage Ivy, Jimmy and Alfred in hopes that Alfred will realise that Ivy is no good for him. In the end, Alfred realises too late that he was chasing the wrong girl, while Ivy comes to a similar realisation about Jimmy, who was clearly out for sport. He crosses the final line when he takes Ivy out and gets a bit too familiar with her. Angry, she casts Jimmy off, and Jimmy laments to Thomas that the whole venture was a waste of time and money. In the series four Christmas Special, Jimmy travels with the Crawley family to London for the season. At the end, he is seen playing football on the beach, while Thomas watches from a nearby chair.

By the time series five begins, Thomas and Jimmy have grown much closer in their friendship, though it is clear Thomas is still in love with him. When the Valentine he sent to his former employer, Lady Anstruther as a joke, comes back to bite him. Lady Anstruther, returned from France, orchestrates a plan to turn up at Downton Abbey in pursuit of Jimmy. Through a series of notes and letters, all of which Jimmy desperately begs Thomas for advice on, the audience learns that Jimmy's former position with Lady Anstruther included a sexual aspect. Eventually, Jimmy decides that the only thing to do is to satisfy her and hope it'll get her out of his hair. Thomas escorts Jimmy to the guest corridor upstairs and plans to watch the door while Jimmy goes through with it. They share a moment in which Jimmy exhibits some doubt about the plan, wondering if perhaps Lady Anstruther just wants to talk. Thomas watches forlornly as Jimmy enters Lady Anstruther's room, silently wishing Jimmy was coming to him instead. Unluckily, while the tryst is occurring, Lady Edith accidentally starts a fire in a nearby bedroom, which pulls Thomas away from his post. Lord Grantham sends Thomas after Lady Edith, and Thomas can only watch in horror, unable to protect Jimmy this one last time. Lord Grantham bursts into Lady Anstruther's room to sound the alarm and discovers her with Jimmy. After the fire, Lord Grantham tells Carson that Jimmy has to go, but with a good reference. Thomas and Jimmy share a heartfelt goodbye in which Jimmy tearfully tells Thomas that though he never thought he'd get on with a man like him, they truly had been great friends. Thomas tries to remain calm, quietly asking if Jimmy might try writing. Jimmy says he would try, though he's not very good at it, and then leaves the estate a broken man. Thomas later tells Anna Bates that he's upset because he wasn't special to Jimmy, which Anna very adamantly disagrees with. He also later mentions Jimmy to Phyllis Baxter in a bout of sadness and annoyance that he's gone. Jimmy's whereabouts post-Downton are never revealed.

Ethel Parks 
Ethel Parks (played by Amy Nuttall) was the new maid introduced in the second series as Gwen's replacement. Outspoken, Ethel does not like being told what to do by anyone, which often has her in conflict with Anna or Mrs Hughes. She says that she does not want to be in service for the rest of her life and often complains about her surroundings.

She begins an affair with Major Charles Bryant (played by Daniel Pirrie) when he is being treated at Downton while it is a temporary convalescent home. Mrs Hughes dismisses her after discovering the two of them in bed together, but Ethel shortly returns having nowhere else to go when she finds out she is pregnant with his child. She names her son Charlie after his father, before moving away from Downton to start a new life. She is replaced in her position by Jane, a war widow.

In the Great War, Ethel has trouble supporting herself and her son and Mrs Hughes helps her, acting as her friend and bringing her food. Ethel tells Mrs Hughes that her neighbours think she is a war widow but admits that Major Bryant refuses to acknowledge that he is Charlie's father, despite Ethel and Mrs Hughes's best efforts to get him to admit paternity. However, he is killed during the Battle of Vittorio Veneto. When Lady Cora learns that Mrs Hughes is supporting Ethel, she is persuaded to invite Major Bryant's parents to Downton Abbey. Ethel bursts into the meeting with her son, proclaiming that Charlie is their grandchild, but Mr Bryant accuses Ethel of only being after their money and insists that his son was a good man. He also insists that Ethel cannot prove that Charlie is Major Bryant's child. Eventually, his wife persuades him to accept the child as his grandson, and Mr Bryant offers to adopt Charlie. Ethel, however, would not be allowed contact, learning that Charlie will be told that his father died during the war and his mother died of Spanish flu. They insist that they can give Charlie a far better future than Ethel ever could. Horrified by Major Bryant's refusal to acknowledge Charlie and his father's bullying, Ethel refuses the offer.

In the third series, Ethel returns, having entered into a life of prostitution. Considering Charlie's future, she gives him to Mr and Mrs Bryant. She is employed in Crawley house by Isobel and Mrs Patmore teaches her to cook, despite Mrs Bird leaving her post. After Ethel attracts considerable gossip, the Dowager Countess intervenes, having Lady Edith place an advertisement for Ethel, so she may find a position elsewhere and have a fresh start. Despite misgivings, Mrs Crawley agrees with the plan, although Ethel seems unwilling to accept any position aside from one close to Charlie's new home. In response to this, the Dowager Countess decides to ask Mrs Bryant in person if Ethel could have contact with Charlie. Mrs Bryant, who had been unhappy abandoning Ethel from the start, agrees and Ethel leaves Mrs Crawley's employment.

Joseph Molesley 
Joseph Molesley (played by Kevin Doyle) (b. 1873) was the butler of Crawley House, in the village of Downton, and valet for Matthew Crawley. He is the son of Bill Molesley, the winner of the best bloom at the Downton Flower Show in 1913. With Matthew off at war and Mrs Crawley working with the Red Cross in France he and Mrs Bird, the family cook, find themselves in an empty house with no one to serve. A loyal servant, he volunteers his service at the earl's mansion. He has feelings for Anna, but they are unrequited and she later marries Mr Bates. After the war ends he covers for Carson when he falls ill with Spanish influenza, only to accidentally become drunk while tasting the wine for dinner. He returns to Crawley House immediately upon Mr Carson's recovery, though he goes to the great house with Matthew Crawley to be his full-time valet after his marriage to Lady Mary. After Matthew dies in a car accident Molesley loses his job, moves in with his father and struggles to find work as a servant, forced to be a road construction worker and delivery boy.

With the possibility of Alfred leaving to pursue his dreams of being a chef, Mr Carson offers Molesley a job as second footman if Alfred leaves. Molesley is not happy with the prospect, thinking it degrading to become a footman when he has been trained as a valet and butler. In the end, when Alfred does leave, Molesley seeks the job but Carson refuses, citing his great reluctance. But Mrs Hughes and Mrs Patmore intervene and Carson eventually gives in and takes Molesley on as a second footman. Even so, the family still call him by his last name. He finds himself mutually attracted to Lady Grantham's new maid, Baxter. By the end of the series, Molesley finds work as a schoolteacher.

Phyllis Baxter 
Phyllis Baxter (played by Raquel Cassidy), is hired as lady's maid to Cora following the departure of Edna Braithwaite. Baxter is hired on Barrow's recommendation, and Cora is pleased with Baxter. However, it becomes clear that Barrow knows a secret about her, which he uses to his advantage to make her spy on the servants and family, something Baxter is very uncomfortable with.

While Barrow is away in America with Lord Grantham (as John Bates asked to be excused from the trip to remain with his wife), Baxter grows closer to Joseph Molesley, who treats her with respect. He continues to do so after Barrow returns, telling her that he does not care to know what Barrow has over her, but urges her to stand up to him and not let him make her do things she does not wish to do. She, in turn thanks him, describing him as strong and lucky – neither of which he considered himself to be.

Eventually, after Barrow threatens to reveal her secret to Lady Grantham, Baxter is encouraged by Molesley to do so first. She reveals that she had stolen jewellery from a previous employer who treated her nicely, and she went to prison but was released early for good behaviour. Cora is surprised but confused. Baxter is not telling the whole story, something Molesley is convinced of when he hears the same story from Barrow. He believes she must have been lured into doing it, because it is not in her nature.
Baxter later tells Cora the rest of the story: she was tricked into stealing the jewellery by another servant who made her think he loved her, but he ran and left her to take the blame. While Baxter expected to be fired, Cora forgives her and lets her stay on, with the condition that she won't rob her. Mrs Hughes also learns the truth but says no more when she learns that Cora knows.

When Barrow begins treating himself to cure his homosexuality and is suffering, Baxter convinces him to see Dr Clarkson, after which Barrow treats her with more respect. At Brancaster Castle, she helps him embarrass Lord Sinderby's butler at Mary's behest (because the butler was being rude to Tom), and she helps Molesley find evidence exonerating Bates of the murder of Mr Green. When Barrow attempts suicide, it is Baxter who raises the alarm (based on Barrow's earlier behaviour that morning) and finds him in the bathroom in time to save his life.

Baxter and Moseley become very close in the course of the final series and the two films; in A New Era, Baxter accepts Moseley's marriage proposal.

Gwen Dawson 

Gwen Harding (born Dawson) (played by Rose Leslie) was a housemaid at Downton. She is the daughter of a farm-hand. Ambitious, she decides that she no longer wants to work in service and saves up her money to buy a typewriter to take a correspondence course in typing and shorthand. When her typewriter is discovered by Miss O'Brien, she informs the whole staff and Gwen's plan to leave service to become a secretary is the cause of much discussion above and below stairs. Lady Sybil quickly befriends Gwen and tries to help her get a job as a secretary. In August 1914 they are successful and Gwen wins a position at a telephone firm. She does not return in the second series and is replaced by Ethel. In series four, the staff at Downton Abbey receive a letter from Gwen where she tells them she is married.

In series six, Gwen returns, eleven years later, to Downton as a successful married woman, although she visits the mansion only in the fourth episode. Some of the family do not recognise her at first, but when they do they are surprised at her elevated status. Gwen endears herself to the family by revealing that the late Lady Sybil had gone to great lengths to help Gwen become a secretary, and that Sybil's kindness had changed her life.

May Bird 
May Bird (played by Christine Lohr) was the cook for Isobel and Matthew Crawley at Crawley House. Before 1912, she lived in Manchester with the Crawleys as their cook, but when they moved, she went with them. In the first series, she is asked to stand-in for Mrs Patmore as cook at the Abbey while she is away having an eye operation. When Mrs Patmore returns, they run the Garden Party for the hospital fund together. During the Great War, she opened a soup kitchen at Crawley House, in secret, and was helped by Mrs Patmore and Daisy to run it from the money given by the government for the hospital. This all occurs when Matthew and his mother were away in France, in the trenches and field hospitals respectively. In the third series, Isobel wants to hire Ethel to work alongside Mrs Bird. When Mrs Bird refuses to work with a former prostitute, she chooses to leave.

Henry Lang 
Henry Lang (played by Cal MacAninch) was Lord Grantham's valet in the absence of Mr Bates. He is a recent war veteran and suffers from severe Combat Stress Reaction (CSR, or shell shock) that causes him to be very nervous and somewhat disconnected to his surroundings. On one notable occasion he wakes the staff in the middle of the night by horrifically screaming during a nightmare. O'Brien, whose brother suffered from shell shock and eventually died in combat, is uncharacteristically sympathetic and kind to him. He later leaves Downton as he feels he is unfit for service.

Jane Moorsum 

Jane Moorsum (played by Clare Calbraith) was a maid at Downton Abbey and Ethel's replacement. She is a widow as her husband died during the First World War. From the start it is clear that Lord Grantham finds Jane attractive and he takes a great interest in the education of her twelve-year-old son, Freddie. At one point Grantham kisses Jane, but they are interrupted by an oblivious Mr Bates and they decide not to have an affair. Shortly after this, of her free will, Jane leaves service at Downton. Lord Grantham insists on using his influence to get Freddie into Ripon Grammar School and paying the school fees in future.

Andrew Parker 

Andrew "Andy" Parker (played by Michael C. Fox) is a footman who starts working at Downton Abbey in 1924. When he was at school he fooled around and never learned how to read or how to write anything but his own name.

Andrew is hired by Carson on a temporary basis to work the week of Lady Rose MacClare's wedding at Grantham House in London. He formerly worked as a hall boy, but wants to become a footman. The Dowager Countess's Lady's Maid Gladys Denker takes advantage of him to go out drinking, but Thomas Barrow comes to his rescue, teaching Denker a lesson in the process.

Mr Carson overhears the news of Lord Grantham's della Francesca painting selling "amazingly well" and takes advantage of this news to hire a new footman at Downton Abbey. Barrow asks Mr Carson to hire Andrew for the job. Carson had expressed his concerns about Andrew's suitability after the gambling club incident, but Mrs Hughes, Barrow, and Daisy urge him to give Andrew a second chance.

Andrew serves drinks before a fox hunt. He appears to have been warned off Thomas by Mr Carson, Mrs Hughes, and Mrs Patmore. During an informal ball in the servant's hall, he dances with Daisy. Andy tries to break ties with Thomas, on account of Mr Carson, Mrs Hughes, and Mrs Patmore informing him that Thomas is a homosexual.

Andy helps Mr Mason move into Yew Tree Farm with Mrs Patmore and Daisy. He volunteers to help Mr Mason take care of Downton's pigs and shows an interest in farming. Mr Mason gave some books to Andy, and he reveals to Thomas that he can write no more than his own name; Thomas offers to teach him to read and write. Andy later apologises to Thomas about his treatment towards him.

In series six and the 2015 Christmas Special, Andy and Daisy share some special moments with each other and it looks as if they might live at Yew Tree farm with Mr Mason and possibly get married. In the first film, they are engaged, but Daisy shows less enthusiasm; when she appears to flirt with a plumber, Andy's jealousy leads him to sabotage a pump. After he confesses to Daisy, she reveals she wasn't flirting and, impressed by his actions, is ready to start planning her marriage to Andy.

In the second feature film, Andy and Daisy are married and both living together on the farm with Mr Mason, and after the departure of Thomas Barrow it is hinted that Andy will succeed Barrow as Downton's butler.

Friends and acquaintances

The Hon. Evelyn Napier 
Evelyn Napier (played by Brendan Patricks) is the son and heir of Viscount Branksome and a suitor for Lady Mary, but later becomes engaged to "one of the Semphill girls". This engagement is broken off and during the war he is injured.

He returns to Downton in 1922, clearly still interested in the recently widowed Mary. He is accompanied by his boss Charles Blake as they are working on a government project studying estates and their progress.

Duke of Crowborough 

The Duke of Crowborough (played by Charlie Cox) was one of many potential suitors for Lady Mary, but he was seeking a wealthy wife to cure his financial problems. He is a past lover of Thomas, at the time first footman, but this affair ends in autumn 1912, after the duke visits Downton under the pretext of courting Mary, then tricks her into leading him into the servants' quarters, where he retrieves a packet of love letters to prevent Thomas from blackmailing him over the affair.

He is never referred to by name on the show, but the published scripts reveal his first name to be Philip. His last name remains unknown.

Patrick Gordon 
Patrick Gordon (played by Trevor White) is a major in the Princess Patricia's Canadian Light Infantry who made a request to stay at the convalescent home at Downton Abbey because he claims he is related to the Crawley family. Major Gordon then claims to be Patrick Crawley, the first cousin once removed of the Earl who perished with his father James Crawley in the sinking of the Titanic (neither of their bodies were recovered). Gordon says he was rescued from the freezing ocean by Fifth Officer Harold Lowe but developed amnesia and was sent to Montreal after being mistaken for a Canadian. He took his new surname from a bottle of gin. It is impossible to recognise Major Gordon as Patrick Crawley because his face was severely burned during the Battle of Passchendaele. Gordon convinces Lady Edith by relating experiences in Downton. For example, he recalls that he and the sisters disliked their governess, which Edith identifies specifically as Fräulein Kelder. Gordon decides to leave, rather than commit to his claim, after learning the earl's agents will be investigating Peter Gordon's history after his emigration to Canada. It is suggested by the earl's solicitor, George Murray, that Major Gordon might actually be Peter Gordon, who worked with the real Patrick Crawley at the Foreign Office, which would explain how he knew some of the private details of the Earl's family.

Lavinia Swire 
Lavinia Catherine Swire (played by Zoe Boyle) (1895–1919) is the sweetheart and fiancée of Matthew Crawley. She is the daughter of London solicitor Reggie Swire, to whom she has been very close ever since her mother's death during her early childhood. In 1912, she brings private papers of her uncle Jonathan Swire, a Liberal minister, to Sir Richard Carlisle since Sir Richard plans to financially ruin her father. The papers Lavinia stole inadvertently helped create the Marconi scandal. She first meets Matthew when he is back in England on leave from the Army and they later become engaged. When Matthew returns from the First World War injured she refuses to leave him despite being told that he will never walk again and is impotent. Lavinia dies at Downton of Spanish influenza after Matthew regains use of his legs and shortly before their wedding. Just before her death she confesses to Matthew that she had seen the kiss between him and Mary and tells him that her death is the best for all of them. Her father dies shortly after and Matthew honours his deathbed wish for his ashes to be placed in Lavinia's grave. Matthew is left a considerable sum by Mr Swire, and Matthew is initially consumed with guilt and refuses to accept it. Matthew eventually relents and uses the money to save Downton Abbey from bankruptcy following Lord Grantham's having lost his wife's fortune through bad investments.

Sir Richard Carlisle 

Richard Carlisle (played by Iain Glen) is the fiancé of Lady Mary Crawley in series two. The brusque, domineering and nouveau riche Carlisle is a self-made, extremely wealthy newspaper magnate from Edinburgh whose paper, with the help of Lavinia Swire, was instrumental in breaking the Marconi scandal story. It is to Carlisle, as a man of influence, that Lady Mary turns to when she concludes that marrying Matthew is not an option. However, Violet and the family remain suspicious of him as he is "new money" and is described by Lord Grantham as "a hawker of newspaper scandal". Although he says his feelings for her are sincere, and he offers to buy a stately home near Downton where they can live together and start a family, he demands near-total control and threatens that if she leaves him he will expose her liaison with Ottoman attaché Kemal Pamuk, which he has covered up from exposure. He also helps cover up the scandal that the murder trial of Downton valet Bates would cause. In the second series Christmas episode, it is apparent that Carlisle's pragmatism does not sit well with the Crawleys and he and Mary begin to argue more frequently, much to the consternation of Matthew and her grandmother. Eventually Mary breaks off the engagement to him after the pair argue with increased frequency, and after Lord Grantham discovers the truth from Lady Grantham and advises Mary not to be unhappy with someone she does not love. Carlisle leaves the morning before the Servants' Ball, but not before revealing that he did genuinely love her. It is not known whether he went ahead and published the story. Ultimately, his actions do not matter, as she confesses to Matthew about Pamuk and Matthew proposes to her despite this.

Vera Bates 

Vera Bates (played by Maria Doyle Kennedy) (d. 1918) was the estranged wife of John Bates. Having known each other since childhood, they married young and had a very unhappy marriage. In between serving in the Anglo-Boer War and joining the staff at Downton Abbey, John Bates went to prison for a theft that Vera had committed.

Using her husband's name, she obtains a service post in the household of the Marquess of Flintshire since the Marchioness of Flintshire is the Earl of Grantham's cousin. The Marchioness's lady's maid tells Vera about Lady Mary's liaison with Kemal Pamuk. When Vera learns that her husband has a larger than expected inheritance after his mother's death, she arrives at Downton Abbey. She asks for large amounts of money, refusing a divorce so he cannot marry fellow servant Anna, and blackmails him, threatening to expose Lady Mary's secret. She also wants her husband back since she has tried living on her own and does not like it. Bates returns to London with her to live in his mother's home but soon separates after learning that she has been unfaithful to him. Eventually he returns to his post as Robert's valet, and he and Anna rekindle their romance. O'Brien, always against Bates, writes to Vera to tell her where he is and about his and Anna's blossoming romance.

Irate, she goes to Sir Richard Carlisle and sells him the story of Lady Mary, unaware that Sir Richard is engaged to Lady Mary and has no intention of publishing the story. Furious over this, she tells the judge in her divorce case that Bates paid her off to consent to it. The judge voids the divorce decree, with the result that Vera and John are still legally married. Mr Bates goes to London to confront her and returns to Downton with a large scratch on his face, telling Anna that their meeting went terribly. The next day, Vera is found dead from ingestion of rat poison. The police are convinced that Bates murdered her and he is convicted and sentenced to death, before the sentence is commuted to life in prison. While John is in prison, Anna is able to track down a neighbour of Vera's who saw her on the day of her death. She tells Anna that she remembers Vera had dried food under her fingernails, meaning that Vera made the pie herself knowing that her husband would be implicated for murder. The neighbour also stated that she had seen Vera walking down the street when the gas lights had come on (she said they made a sort of "halo" around Vera's head), which would have been when Bates was already on his way back home. Bates is then released from prison due to the neighbour's statement.

Mr Mason 

Mr Albert Mason (played by Paul Copley) is the father of William, the Downton footman who died of injuries received in the Great War. In 1913, Mason's wife dies of a heart attack leaving him on his own on their farm. Mr Mason becomes father-in-law to Daisy when she marries his son on his deathbed. After William's death in 1918, Mr Mason sometimes calls at Downton to speak to Daisy, believing that she loved William as much as he did. Although Daisy finds this awkward at first, after he tells Daisy that William thought she was special and that his father would have no children left after his own death, their relationship changes and becomes akin to that of father and daughter.

In 1920, he expresses his wish to name Daisy his sole heir, and asks her to come live at the farm so he may teach her how to run it. When Daisy visits him again in 1922, she is trying to avoid Alfred, who is saying his final goodbyes at the house. But Mr Mason insists to Daisy she has to say goodbye to him properly, and offers to help her find the right words to say.

In the final series, after losing his tenancy at a neighbouring estate, he is offered the tenancy of Yew Tree Farm in Downton, thanks to the unflagging efforts of Daisy. He would take on Downton footman Andy Parker as a farmhand, and at series end, would be pleased when Daisy would finally move to Yew Tree Farm with him at long last. He would also gain the companionship of Mrs Patmore, Daisy dropping any objections she had about her father in-law and her superior at Downton Abbey being together.

In Downton Abbey: A New Era, newlyweds Daisy and Andy are sharing the farm with Mr Mason. However, Mason becomes persnickety with the living conditions, which grates on the young couple. For his part, Mason knows how he is affecting them and tries to give them as much space as possible. Daisy suggests that he could take up residence with Mrs Patmore, but Mason dislikes the idea of being retired and dependent on a woman not his wife. Daisy 'guides' Mrs Patmore into suggesting to Mason that he would be welcome in her cottage, and that it would be best for all concerned. Mason, still enamored with Mrs Patmore, agrees to surrender the farm lease to Daisy and Andy and go to live with her.

Joe Burns 
Joe Burns (played by Bill Fellows) is a former suitor to Mrs Hughes. When Elsie turns his proposal down he later married Ivy (died 1910) and had one son Peter, who joined the army. He meets Mrs Hughes at a fair in Downton after the death of Ivy and asked her a second time to marry him, giving her a parting gift of a small doll. Later, however, he is turned down as Mrs Hughes does not wish to leave Downton, but the two part on good terms.

Lieutenant-General Sir Herbert Strutt 
Lieutenant-General Sir Herbert Strutt KCB, DSO (played by Julian Wadham) is a senior British Army general known as the "Hero of the Somme". He visits Downton Abbey in 1917 as part of a tour of England to drum up support for the war effort. During a dinner in his honour, Branson, the Irish nationalist and socialist chauffeur, attempts to avenge himself on the Army by pouring a soup tureen of slop over the general, but he is stopped in time by Carson the butler (who after reading Branson's apology note to Lady Sybil, found by Anna, thought Branson meant to assassinate the general). Sir Herbert leaves Downton the next morning with no knowledge of the incident.

Dr Richard Clarkson 
Richard Clarkson (played by David Robb) is the Crawley family doctor. During the second series, he becomes an army surgeon after the outbreak of the Great War, and as a major becomes the military commander at Downton when the house becomes a convalescent hospital. When Matthew is injured, he thinks his spine may have been broken, but is proven wrong when Matthew walks again (he was just suffering from spinal shock, which didn't permanently disable his legs).

In the third series, when Lady Sybil goes into labour, he sees signs that she is suffering from eclampsia and is in danger of dying from the intense seizures and distress. However, because of his misdiagnosis of Matthew, Robert hires a well-known doctor who strongly disagrees with Clarkson. At first Sybil seems fine after the birth, but late in the night is found having fits and dies. Cora blames Robert for Sybil's death because he did not listen to Clarkson. Violet has Clarkson lie to mend their marriage. In a journey to the highlands it is revealed that Dr Clarkson has developed romantic feelings for Isobel Crawley. He had planned to make a proposal of marriage to her and took her to the village fair. However, after she explains her feelings on marriage he doesn't act.

The Rev. Albert Travis 
Albert Travis (played by Michael Cochrane) is the Rector of St Mary's Downton whose living is under the patronage of the Earl of Grantham. During the Great War, after William is brought back to Downton mortally wounded, the Dowager Countess summons him to wed William and Daisy before William dies. Despite his questions, he does so. Later he arranges Lavinia Swire's funeral and then the wedding for Matthew and Mary, even though the Archbishop of York performs it. He also nearly weds Edith to Anthony Strallan before he jilts her at the altar (Travis and the Dowager discussed Strallan's first wife beforehand). Robert then asks him to dinner after Tom Branson expresses his wish to baptise his daughter Catholic like himself, a decision Robert opposes. Travis insults the Catholic faith and believes the Anglican Church is superior. But Edith, Mary, Matthew and Isobel defend Tom, and Mary settles the matter once and for all by revealing Sybil did not object to her child being a Catholic. Cora then silences Robert.

Kemal Pamuk 
Kemal Pamuk (played by Theo James) (d. 1913) was an attaché at the Turkish Embassy in London and the son of one of the Ottoman Sultan's ministers. While participating in the "Albanian talks" he visits Downton as a guest, accompanying Evelyn Napier. His good looks are widely commented on and attract both Mary and Thomas. In the course of a sexual encounter with Mary, Pamuk dies in her bed of a heart attack. Mary enlists the help of Anna and Cora to move his body, which is seen by Daisy. She is coerced by O'Brien into telling Edith, who writes to the Turkish Ambassador. The tale becomes known to other members of the family after it becomes a rumour in London. Vera Bates uses the story to blackmail Bates into going back to her, which he does to save Anna's reputation. Sir Richard Carlisle tricks Mrs Bates into selling the story, to save Mary and later threatens to expose her when she wants to break off their engagement. Cora tells Robert the whole story when he asks if there is another reason for Mary staying with Carlisle when she obviously does not like him.

The story was inspired by true events. In 1996, Julian Fellowes learned that, according to a friend's great aunt's diary, around 1890 a diplomat did die in the bed of a single woman; the woman and a matron carried the diplomat's corpse to his guest bed, where a valet later found him; the secret was kept for a century.

John Drake 
John Drake (played by Fergus O'Donnell) is a tenant farmer on the estate of the Earl of Grantham. He is married and has several young children. In March 1913, he is diagnosed as suffering from dropsy of the heart and is certain to die. Isobel Crawley knows of a cure, but as a modern medical technique it is unfamiliar to Dr Clarkson, who is reluctant to try it. Her determination to treat the man piques the ire of Violet, Dowager Countess of Grantham, and preparing for a showdown, Violet shows up at Mr Drake's bedside only to witness the procedure and its unmitigated success.

During the First World War with the men away fighting, Mr Drake needs help on his farm. Lady Edith has recently learned to drive and she volunteers to drive their tractor. Over the next few weeks she continues to help while Drake has taken a liking to her. One evening Drake kisses her and Lady Edith is pleased. Mrs Drake secretly witnesses the kiss and soon after, the Drakes hire a man to replace Edith.

Sir Anthony Strallan, Bt 

Anthony Strallan (played by Robert Bathurst) was Edith's much older suitor. He has been widowed since the death of his wife Maud. His love of automobiles was a common interest that he shared with Edith and as well as bringing them close together inspired Edith to learn to drive. He was planning to propose to Edith before Mary tricked him into thinking Edith would reject him and he leaves without an explanation. In the Christmas special he is invited by Lord Grantham to the traditional Christmas shoot but repeatedly turns it down. Edith learns that he suffered a debilitating injury to his arm serving in the First World War, hence his refusal. She is convinced that he may take her back and they can get married, but he gently tells her that he is too old for her and that he doesn't want her to waste away her life caring for him. In series three, Edith and Anthony reconnect and are soon engaged. However, Anthony jilts Edith at the altar, devastating her.

He has a sister, Mrs Chetwood, who writes to Cora with the recipe for his favourite dessert, apple charlotte.

Michael Gregson 
Michael Gregson (played by Charles Edwards) (d. around 8 November 1923) is a London editor for the society magazine The Sketch. After Lady Edith has a letter published in a newspaper proclaiming support for women's rights, Michael writes to her at least twice offering her a column in his magazine. Encouraged by her family (excepting her father, who thought Gregson just wanted to take advantage of her title and wealth) she went to see him in London and accepted his offer.

Michael encouraged Edith to never be afraid to speak her mind and to write about whatever she wanted, even if it was not expected of a woman. He began flirting with her, later admitting he is attracted to her. But when she reveals she knows he is married, he explains that his wife, Lizzy, whom he loved very much, has been in an insane asylum for some years with no hope of recovery. Under English law, her status as a lunatic cannot be used as grounds for divorce because she is neither the guilty nor innocent party. Edith stays on (she had intended to resign because she was repulsed that a married man was flirting with her) after Michael expresses his hope that she will, citing how much it cheers him to meet her when they do and to read her column.

Michael follows Edith and her family to Scotland in 1921, where he meets her family. Cora instantly takes a liking to him, whereas Mary and Robert do not. Matthew defends Michael against his wife and goes stalking and fishing with him. But when learning of his status, Matthew (as the heir to Downton Abbey) instructs him to put an end to his relationship with Edith. Though he tries, Edith tells him she doesn't care that he is married, and agrees to be his secret mistress in the future. Matthew dies suddenly in a car crash only days later, and he never informed his wife Mary or her parents of his discussion with Gregson while fishing.

Determined to find any way to legally marry Edith, he learns if he becomes a German citizen he can divorce Lizzy. He cares not for what others will think of him for changing his citizenship (particularly when Britain only beat Germany in the Great War a few years previously), only of Edith's love. She visits him in London, and he has a cocktail party that important artists and literary figures like Virginia Woolf attend. Edith then invites him to a party at Downton, where he begins to earn her father's respect. Before going to Munich to begin his path to obtain German citizenship, he and Edith spend their last night together, making love for the first and last time. She loses her virginity to him. Gregson then has Edith sign legal papers; should anything happen to him, she will inherit his modern London apartment and the newspaper. Gregson arrives in Munich, then vanishes with no word. Edith does not hear from him, which worries her, especially when she receives a shocking letter from a London doctor informing her that she is pregnant. Despite not hearing from him, her intense romantic affections for him never falter. Edith is very worried and decides to get an abortion. Her Aunt Rosamund finds out and accompanies her to get the abortion in London. Edith changes her mind at the very last second, and she and Rosamund concoct a ridiculous story that they would like to take a holiday in Switzerland for a few months to "improve their French." Edith's grandmother (and Rosamund's mother) is highly suspicious of this plan and discovers later that Edith left when she was around 3–4 months pregnant to give birth there.

By 1923, he still has not been found, but pieces of what happened to him are coming to light. At first, Edith was told he disappeared after going out once he checked into his Munich hotel. Then she learns he got into a fight with some men in Munich after taking exception to what they were saying. "They're quite well known apparently. They wear brown shirts and go around preaching the most horrible things," as Edith later tells her aunt. Her child by him, a daughter named Marigold, was at first given to a family in Switzerland, where she gave birth. Edith decides she wants the child back and plans to reclaim her, then places her in the care of a local pig farmer and his wife. She also feels, knowing Michael granted her power of attorney and she might inherit all he has if he is confirmed dead, that she must give something to their daughter, whom she then decides to reclaim.

In 1924, news arrives that Michael was probably killed during the Beer Hall Putsch, leaving Edith devastated as she never lost hope that he might be alive in prison perhaps. Her father Robert tells his wife Cora that there is no identifiable body, and "what was left of him" was supposedly buried somewhere. Edith inherits his publishing company and reclaims their daughter, Marigold. This greatly upsets the farmer's wife, who was led to believe that the child was the orphaned daughter of her husband's friend whom she never met. The wife tells Cora that Marigold is Edith's illegitimate child, which shocks her. She now realises the 10-month trip to Switzerland was a farce. Cora agrees, though, that Marigold should be brought up at Downton. Cora and Edith make up a story to tell her father Robert, that the pig farmer cannot financially care for this child along with his own children, and Edith asks Robert if Marigold can become her "ward." Robert very reluctantly agrees, and feels sorry that Edith is a "spinster" with no boyfriend or prospects in sight. Robert later realises Marigold bears a strong resemblance to Gregson, and then tells Cora that he thinks Marigold is Edith's daughter. Months later, while on vacation, he tells Edith he knows about Marigold, and he believes Michael was an honourable man, with which she agrees, stating Michael would have married her as soon as he could. Robert says they will do their best for Marigold for both Michael's and Edith's sake, while still keeping the truth confined to the family. Her sister Mary is the last in the family to discover, in late 1925, that Marigold is Edith's daughter, and that she is Marigold's aunt.

Lord Merton 
Richard "Dickie" Grey, Lord Merton (played by Douglas Reith) is Mary's godfather and a widower with at least two sons, Larry and Tim Grey. He was interested in studying medicine once in his life, but his father did not think it suitable for someone of his position. Nevertheless, he maintains a fascination with medicine.

Lord Merton is invited to dinner at Downton Abbey along with his family before Mary and Matthew's wedding. His son Larry, who was once keen on Sybil, treats her husband Tom with rudeness and disrespect. He drugs Tom's drink so that he appears drunk. When Anthony Strallan reveals what Larry had done, Lord Merton asks his son if it was true. After Larry unremorsefully calls Tom "only a grubby little chauffeur chappie", Lord Merton angrily tells him to be silent, and apologises very sincerely to Tom for what Larry did, adding his hope that Tom would recover before the wedding.

In 1922 he joins Violet and Isobel for lunch, later taking a walk with Isobel. By 1923 he has taken a keen interest in Isobel, whom he meets again at a ball at Grantham House. In 1924 they announce they are getting married, but Violet isn't so happy (because she does not want to lose her friend and companion in Isobel). Isobel becomes disheartened after Larry and his brother Tim treat her disrespectfully. Lord Merton remarks that both his sons are very much like his late wife, to whom he was not happily married. Though Isobel is concerned about marrying Lord Merton when his sons do not approve of her, Violet insists she should not let them ruin her future. With Violet's help, Isobel proposes to Lord Merton, who accepts, to the horror of his son and daughter in-law, and they are married in the series finale.

Anthony Foyle, Viscount Gillingham 

Anthony Foyle, Viscount Gillingham, also known as Tony Gillingham (played by Tom Cullen), is a love interest of Lady Mary in series four and five. During the War, he served with Charles Blake in the Royal Navy aboard Jellicoe's flagship HMS Iron Duke at the Battle of Jutland. He knew Mary since they were young children, but they did not become reacquainted as adults until after Matthew's death at the end of series three. At this time, he had only recently succeeded to the viscountcy. He announces he is in love with Mary and proposes to her surprise, but she says they barely know each other, and she is not ready to marry again so soon after being widowed. Tony instead becomes engaged to the Hon. Mabel Lane-Fox, whom Mary refers to as "the greatest heiress of the season." Nevertheless, Tony remains lukewarm about Mabel and seems keen on Mary. When he returns to Downton to attend a house party, his valet, Mr Green, rapes Anna. When Mary discovers that it was Green who assaulted Anna, she asks Tony to dismiss him, but says she cannot tell him why. Shortly after this, Green is killed near Tony's house in Piccadilly Circus, and Tony travels to Downton to tell Mary the shocking news.

Tony later calls off his engagement to Mabel, because of his interest in Mary. She begins to feel he is a sensible match for her. He convinces her to go away with him to a hotel in Liverpool to be lovers, and she agrees, wanting to be sure he is the right man for her. After spending the weekend together, he talks of their engagement, but she realises he is not the man for her. She says they do not have enough in common, and Violet later says it is because Tony was not clever enough for her. She calls it off with him but he becomes angry and refuses to break it off with her. Mabel Lane-Fox returns and begins pursuing him again, but he is still convinced that it would be dishonorable not to marry Mary after their affair. Charles Blake stages a scene where Mabel and Tony come across Charles and Mary supposedly in a passionate kiss, and finally, Tony gives up on Mary and decides to marry Mabel.

Igor Kuragin 
Prince Igor Kuragin (played by Rade Sherbedgia) is a former Russian nobleman forced into exile as a result of the 1917 Revolution. As a powerful and extremely wealthy noble with palaces and thousands of acres of land, he and Violet met in Saint Petersburg in 1874 while she and her husband, the then Earl of Grantham, were in the retinue of Prince Alfred, Duke of Edinburgh. Though both Prince Kuragin and Violet were married, they fell in love and attempted to run away together, but did not succeed. During the Revolution many years later, Prince Kuragin and his wife, Princess Irina Kuragina, were arrested by the Bolsheviks and separated. Though Prince Kuragin was subsequently released, he learned that his wife had been exiled a year before. Left virtually penniless, he makes his way to England and settles in York, where he receives aid from a charity for émigré Russian refugees. Through Lady Rose MacClare, who is one of the helpers, he learns of her relationship to Violet and that the Dowager Countess still lives at Downton. He joins his fellow former nobles on an outing to Downton in the spring of 1924. At Downton Abbey, he meets Violet again, who is shocked by his reappearance and what has happened to him. Violet attempts to find the whereabouts of Princess Irina through Lord Flintshire, who is her nephew-in-law, and eventually receives a letter from Lord Flintshire saying the Princess may have fled to Wan Chai, Hong Kong, where she might be working as a nurse.

Unlike many Russian aristocrats after the Revolution, Prince Kuragin does not appear to be an anti-Semite; when he meets Atticus Aldridge and realises his family fled Odessa due to the Tsar's anti-Jewish pogroms, he tells Atticus that he is "not proud of why they chose to go."

Historical figures

Cosmo Lang, Archbishop of York 
The Archbishop of York and future Archbishop of Canterbury, Dr Cosmo Gordon Lang (Michael Culkin) marries Lady Mary Crawley and Matthew Crawley in the spring of 1920. He also comes to Downton Abbey for dinner later that year.

Dame Nellie Melba 
Nellie Melba (Kiri Te Kanawa) gives an operatic performance at the Abbey in 1922, where Cora intervenes to ensure she is treated as a guest of the family rather than a member of staff. While the family, guests and staff listen to Melba's performance upstairs, Green sexually assaults Anna in the servants' quarters. Rupert Christiansen, writing in The Telegraph, bemoaned the casting and the fact checking.

Freda Dudley Ward 
Freda Dudley Ward (Janet Montgomery) asks Rose for help after a compromising letter from the Prince of Wales is stolen from her handbag by Sampson. She also discusses with Charles Blake his feelings for Mary.

King George V 
George V (Guy Williams) is the king to whom Rose MacClare is presented at court in 1923. He addresses her when the Prince of Wales mentions that her father, Lord Flintshire, hosted the prince's tour of India. When Rose responds that the prince was very popular, the king dryly remarks that "the prince is never short of popularity." The king is later heard in a radio broadcast, voiced by Jon Glover. He is portrayed by Simon Jones in the film.

Queen Mary 
George V's wife, Queen Mary (Valerie Dane), appears with her husband at the debutante ball. She appeared in the film, played by Geraldine James.

The Prince of Wales 
The Prince of Wales (Oliver Dimsdale), the future King Edward VIII, is also present at Rose's debutante ball, and his affair with the married Freda Dudley Ward is the centre of Sampson's blackmail plot. He later opens the ball at Grantham House and dances with Rose.

The Duke of York 
Prince Albert, Duke of York (Jonathan Townsend), the future King George VI, is present at Rose's debutante ball.

Neville Chamberlain 
As the Minister for Health, the future Prime Minister Neville Chamberlain (Rupert Frazer) is persuaded to dine at Downton Abbey by Violet in May 1925 (his wife Anne is her goddaughter). Violet hopes to persuade him to allow the Downton village hospital to remain under the control of the Crawley family, instead of having it merge with a major hospital in York. The intended dinner conversation quickly becomes a heated argument in front of the bemused minister, and the Earl of Grantham collapses from a perforated ulcer, ending the gathering while he is rushed to hospital. Chamberlain later reveals to Tom that he had been blackmailed into attending by Violet, who knew of his role in one of the notorious pranks performed by his brother-in-law, Horace de Vere Cole (in their youth, de Vere Cole, Chamberlain and some others had disguised themselves as workmen and had dug a trench across Piccadilly Circus, causing a massive traffic jam "from the East End to Belgrave Square.")

The Princess Mary, Viscountess Lascelles 
The Princess Mary, Viscountess Lascelles (Kate Phillips) is the only daughter of King George V and Queen Mary. She appeared in the first film. She is unhappy in her marriage, and seeks to end it. However, when Tom Branson speaks to her about his own experiences in learning to live with the Crawley family despite their differences, she is inspired to make her marriage work. Tom doesn't learn her true identity until later.

References

External links

Lists of British television series characters
Characters
Cultural depictions of George V
Cultural depictions of Nellie Melba
Cultural depictions of Neville Chamberlain